= British Museum =

National museum in London, England

Coordinates: 51°31′10″N 0°07′37″W

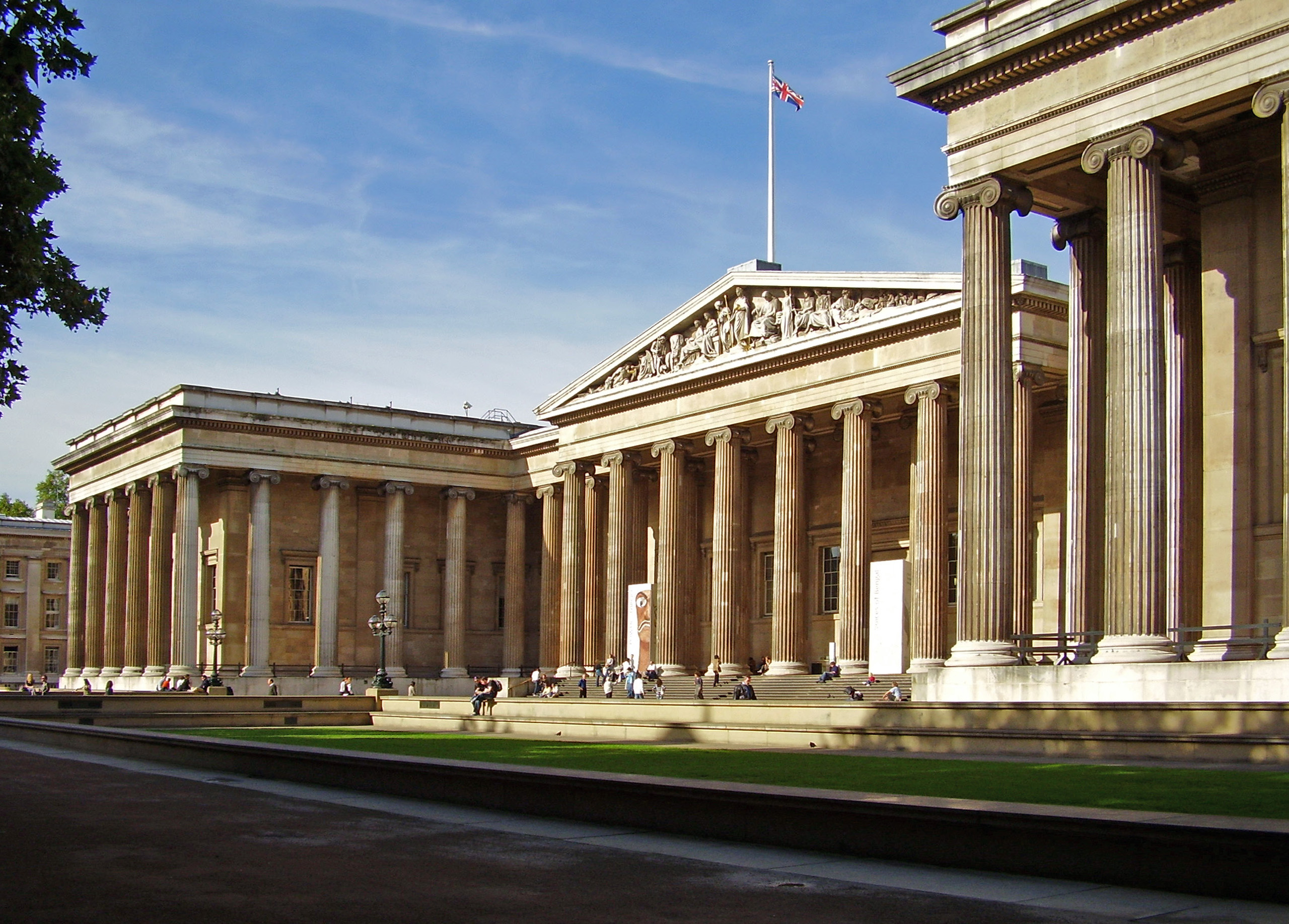

- Location within Central London
- Established: 7 June 1753; 273 years ago
- Location: Great Russell Street, London, England
- Collection size: Approx. 8 million objects
- Visitors: 6,440,120 in 2025: Ranked second nationally
- Chair: George Osborne
- Director: Nicholas Cullinan
- Public transit access: Tottenham Court Road; Goodge Street; Holborn; Russell Square
- Website: britishmuseum.org
- Area: 807,000 sq ft (75,000 m^{2}) in 94 galleries

The British Museum is a public museum dedicated to human history, art and culture located in the Bloomsbury area of London. Its permanent collection of eight million artefacts is the largest in the world. It documents the story of human culture from its beginnings to the present. (Note: Among the national museums in London, sculpture and decorative and applied art are in the Victoria and Albert Museum; the British Museum houses earlier art, non-Western art, prints and drawings. The National Gallery holds the national collection of Western European art to about 1900, while art of the 20th century on is at Tate Modern. Tate Britain holds British Art from 1500 onwards. Books, manuscripts and many works on paper are in the British Library. There are significant overlaps between the coverage of the various collections.) Established in 1753, the British Museum was the world's first public national museum. In 2025, the museum received 6,440,120 visitors and was the second most visited attraction in the United Kingdom.

At its beginning, the museum was largely based on the collections of the Anglo-Irish physician and scientist Sir Hans Sloane. It opened to the public in 1759, in Montagu House, on the site of the current building. The museum's expansion over the following 250 years was largely a result of British colonisation and resulted in the creation of several branch institutions, or independent spin-offs, the first being the Natural History Museum in 1881. Some of its best-known acquisitions, such as the Greek Elgin Marbles and the Egyptian Rosetta Stone, are subject to long-term disputes and repatriation claims.

In 1973, the British Library Act 1972 detached the library department from the British Museum, but it continued to host the now separated British Library in the same Reading Room and building as the museum until 1997. The museum is a non-departmental public body sponsored by the Department for Culture, Media and Sport. Like all UK national museums, it charges no admission fee except for loan exhibitions.

== History ==
=== Sir Hans Sloane ===
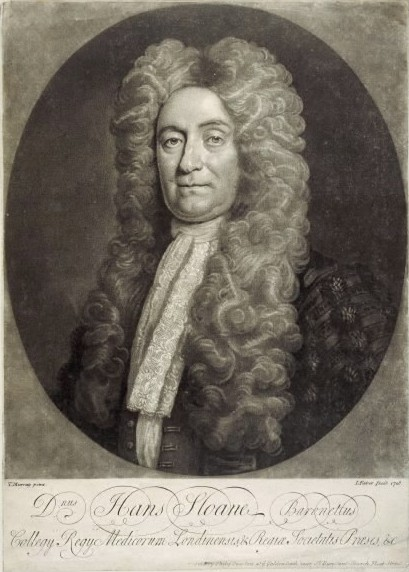
Sir Hans Sloane

Although today principally a museum of cultural art objects and antiquities, the British Museum was founded as a "universal museum". Its foundations lie in the will of the Anglo-Irish physician and naturalist Sir Hans Sloane (1660–1753), a London-based doctor and scientist from Ulster. During the course of his lifetime, and particularly after he married the widow of a wealthy Jamaican planter, Sloane gathered a large collection of curiosities, and not wishing to see his collection broken up after death he bequeathed it to King George II, for the nation, for a sum of £20,000 (equivalent to £3,834,052 in 2025) to be paid to his heirs by Parliament—intentionally far less than the estimated value of the artefacts, contemporarily estimated at £50,000 (equivalent to £9,585,130 in 2025) or more according to some sources, and up to £80,000 (equivalent to £15,336,208 in 2025) or more by others.

At that time, Sloane's collection consisted of around 71,000 objects of all kinds including some 40,000 printed books, 7,000 manuscripts, extensive natural history specimens including 337 volumes of dried plants, prints and drawings including those by Albrecht Dürer and antiquities from Sudan, Egypt, Greece, Rome, the Ancient Near and Far East and the Americas.

=== Foundation (1753) ===
On 7 June 1753, King George II gave his royal assent to the act of Parliament which established the British Museum. (Note: By the act of Parliament it received a name – the British Museum. The origin of the name is not known; the word 'British' had some resonance nationally at this period, so soon after the Jacobite rebellion of 1745; it must be assumed that the museum was christened in this light.) The British Museum Act 1753 also added two other libraries to the Sloane collection, namely the Cottonian Library, assembled by Sir Robert Cotton, dating back to Elizabethan times, and the Harleian Library, the collection of Robert Harley, 1st Earl of Oxford and Mortimer. They were joined in 1757 by the "Old Royal Library", now the Royal manuscripts, assembled by various British monarchs. Together these four "foundation collections" included many of the most treasured books now in the British Library including the Lindisfarne Gospels and the sole surviving manuscript of Beowulf. (Note: The estimated footage of the various libraries as reported to the trustees has been summarised by Harris (1998), 3,6: Sloane 4,600, Harley 1,700, Cotton 384, Edwards 576, The Royal Library 1,890.)

The British Museum was the first of a new kind of museum – national, belonging to neither church nor king, freely open to the public and aiming to collect everything. Sloane's collection, while including a vast miscellany of objects, tended to reflect his scientific interests. The addition of the Cotton and Harley manuscripts introduced a literary and antiquarian element, and meant that the British Museum now became both National Museum and library.

=== Cabinet of curiosities (1753–1778) ===
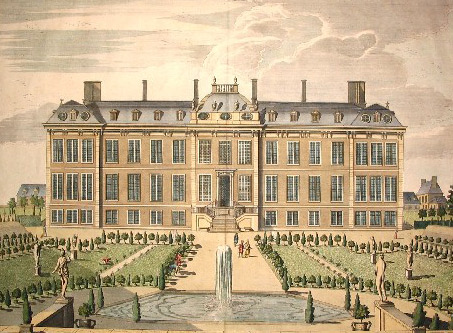
Montagu House, c. 1715

The body of trustees decided on a converted 17th-century mansion, Montagu House, as a location for the museum, which it bought from the Montagu family for £20,000. The trustees rejected Buckingham House, which was later converted into the present day Buckingham Palace, on the grounds of cost and the unsuitability of its location. (Note: This was perhaps rather unfortunate as the title to the house was complicated by the fact that part of the building had been erected on leasehold property (the Crown lease of which ran out in 1771); perhaps that is why George III paid such a modest price (nominally £28,000) for what was to become Buckingham Palace. See Howard Colvin et al. (1976), 134.)

With the acquisition of Montagu House, the first exhibition galleries and reading room for scholars opened on 15 January 1759. At this time, the largest parts of collection were the library, which took up the majority of the rooms on the ground floor and the natural history objects, which took up an entire wing on the first floor. In 1763, the trustees of the British Museum, under the influence of Peter Collinson and William Watson, employed the former student of Carl Linnaeus, Daniel Solander, to reclassify the natural history collection according to the Linnaean system, thereby making the museum a public centre of learning accessible to the full range of European natural historians. In 1823, George IV gave the King's Library assembled by George III, and Parliament gave the right to a copy of every book published in the country, thereby ensuring that the museum's library would expand indefinitely. During the few years after its foundation the British Museum received several further gifts, including the Thomason Collection of Civil War Tracts and David Garrick's library of 1,000 printed plays. The predominance of natural history, books and manuscripts began to lessen when in 1772 the museum acquired for £8,410 its first significant antiquities in Sir William Hamilton's "first" collection of Greek vases.

=== Indolence and energy (1778–1800) ===
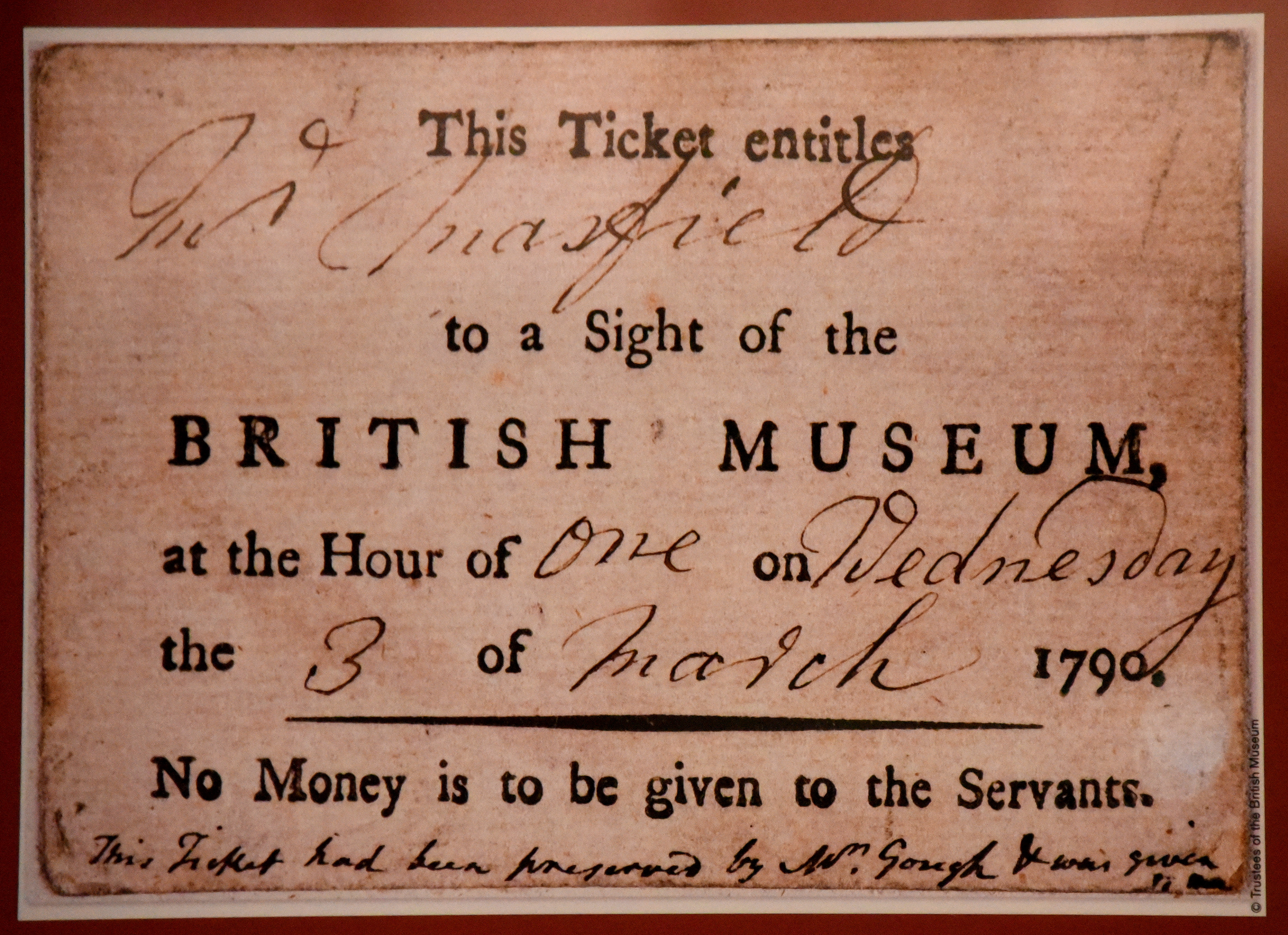
Entrance ticket to the British Museum, London 3 March 1790

From 1778, a display of objects from the South Seas brought back from the round-the-world voyages of Captain James Cook and the travels of other explorers fascinated visitors with a glimpse of previously unknown lands. The bequest of a collection of books, engraved gems, coins, prints and drawings by Clayton Mordaunt Cracherode in 1800 did much to raise the museum's reputation; but Montagu House became increasingly crowded and decrepit and it was apparent that it would be unable to cope with further expansion.

The museum's first notable addition towards its collection of antiquities, since its foundation, was by Sir William Hamilton (1730–1803), British Ambassador to Naples, who sold his collection of Greek and Roman artefacts to the museum in 1784 together with a number of other antiquities and natural history specimens. A list of donations to the museum, dated 31 January 1784, refers to the Hamilton bequest of a "Colossal Foot of an Apollo in Marble". It was one of two antiquities of Hamilton's collection drawn for him by Francesco Progenie, a pupil of Pietro Fabris, who also contributed a number of drawings of Mount Vesuvius sent by Hamilton to the Royal Society in London.

=== Growth and change (1800–1825) ===
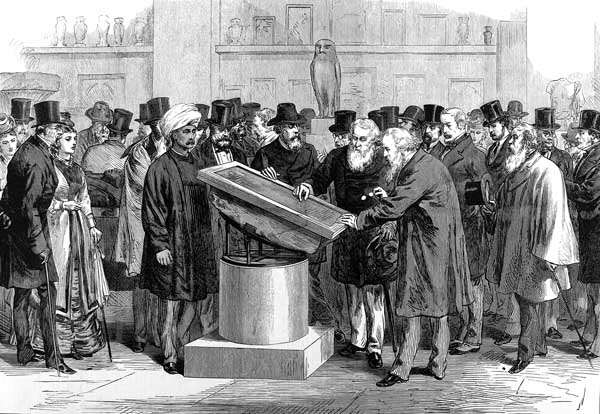
The Rosetta Stone on display in the British Museum in 1874

In the early 19th century the foundations for the extensive collection of sculpture began to be laid and Greek, Roman and Egyptian artefacts dominated the antiquities displays. After the defeat of the French campaign in the Battle of the Nile, in 1801, the British Museum acquired more Egyptian sculptures and in 1802 King George III presented the Rosetta Stone – key to the deciphering of hieroglyphs. Gifts and purchases from Henry Salt, British consul general in Egypt, beginning with the Colossal bust of Ramesses II in 1818, laid the foundations of the collection of Egyptian Monumental Sculpture. Many Greek sculptures followed, notably the first purpose-built exhibition space, the Charles Towneley collection, much of it Roman sculpture, in 1805. In 1806, Thomas Bruce, 7th Earl of Elgin, ambassador to the Ottoman Empire from 1799 to 1803 removed the large collection of marble sculptures from the Parthenon, on the Acropolis of Athens and transferred them to the UK. In 1816 these sculptures were acquired for the British Museum under the British Museum Act 1816 and deposited in the museum thereafter. The collections were supplemented by the Bassae frieze from Phigaleia, Greece in 1815. The Ancient Near Eastern collection also had its beginnings in 1825 with the purchase of Assyrian and Babylonian antiquities from Mary Mackintosh Rich, the widow of Assyriologist Claudius James Rich.

In 1802 a buildings committee was set up to plan for expansion of the museum, and further highlighted by the donation in 1822 of the King's Library, personal library of King George III, comprising 65,000 volumes, 19,000 pamphlets, maps, charts and topographical drawings. The neoclassical architect, Sir Robert Smirke, was asked to draw up plans for an eastern extension to the museum "... for the reception of the Royal Library, and a Picture Gallery over it ..." and put forward plans for today's quadrangular building, much of which can be seen today. The dilapidated Old Montagu House was demolished and work on the King's Library Gallery began in 1823. The extension, the East Wing, was completed by 1831. However, following the founding of the National Gallery, London in 1824, (Note: Understanding of the foundation of the National Gallery is complicated by the fact that there is no documented history of the institution. At first the National Gallery functioned effectively as part of the British Museum, to which the trustees transferred most of their most important pictures (ex. portraits). Full control was handed over to the National Gallery in 1868, after the National Gallery Act 1856 established the gallery as an independent body.) the proposed Picture Gallery was no longer needed, and the space on the upper floor was given over to the natural history collections.

The first Synopsis of the British Museum was published in 1808. This described the contents of the museum, and the display of objects room by room, and updated editions were published every few years.

=== Largest building site in Europe (1825–1850) ===
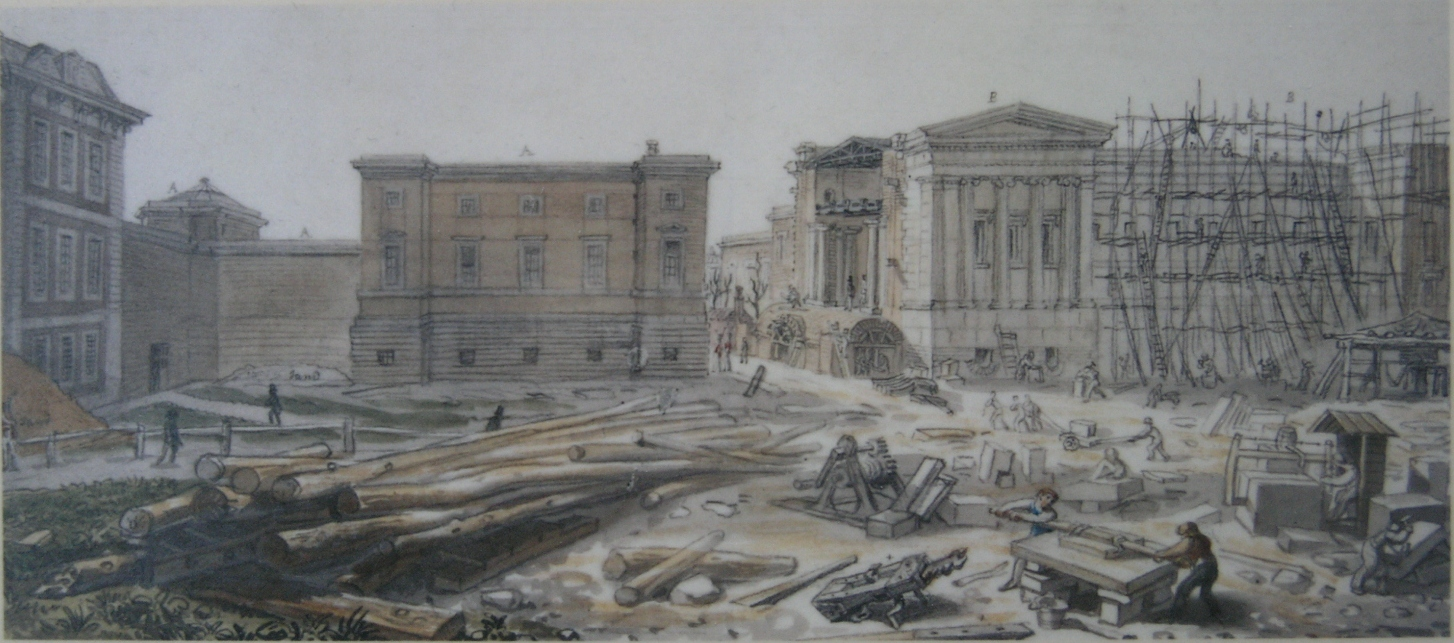
Left to Right: Montagu House, Townley Gallery and Sir Robert Smirke's west wing under construction, July 1828

As Sir Robert Smirke's grand neo-classical building gradually arose, the museum became a construction site. The King's Library, on the ground floor of the East Wing, was handed over in 1827, and was described as one of the finest rooms in London. Although it was not fully open to the general public until 1857, special openings were arranged during The Great Exhibition of 1851.

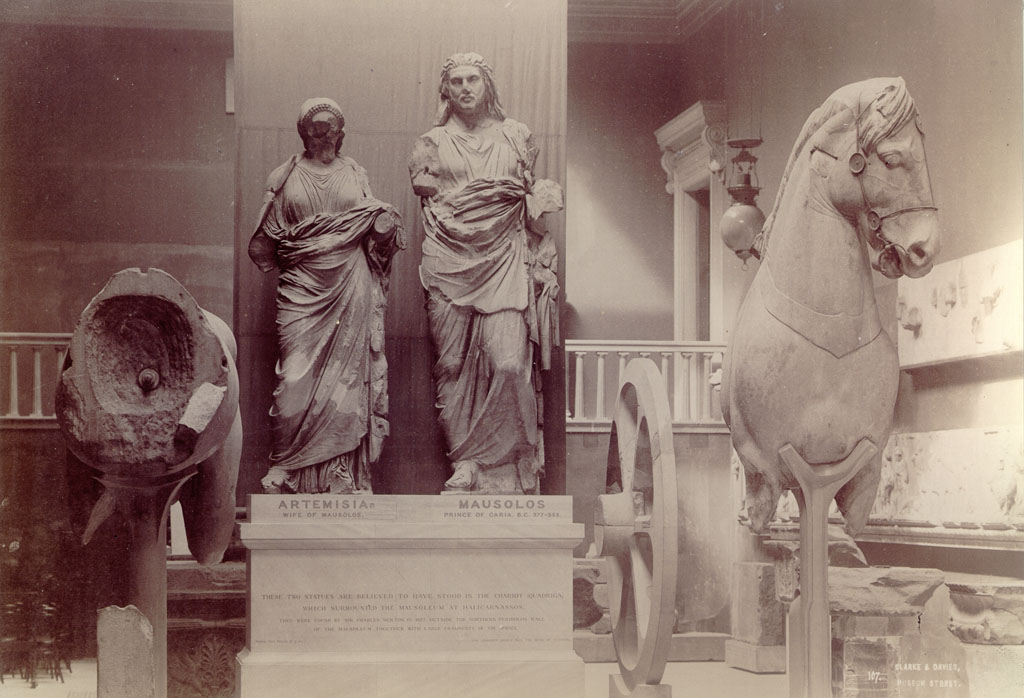
The Mausoleum of Halicarnassus Room, 1920s

In 1840, the museum became involved in its first overseas excavations, Charles Fellows's expedition to Xanthos, in Asia Minor, whence came remains of the tombs of the rulers of ancient Lycia, among them the Nereid and Payava monuments. In 1857, Charles Newton was to discover the 4th-century BC Mausoleum at Halicarnassus, one of the Seven Wonders of the Ancient World. In the 1840s and 1850s the museum supported excavations in Assyria by A.H. Layard and others at sites such as Nimrud and Nineveh. Of particular interest to curators was the eventual discovery of Ashurbanipal's great library of cuneiform tablets, which helped to make the museum a focus for Assyrian studies.

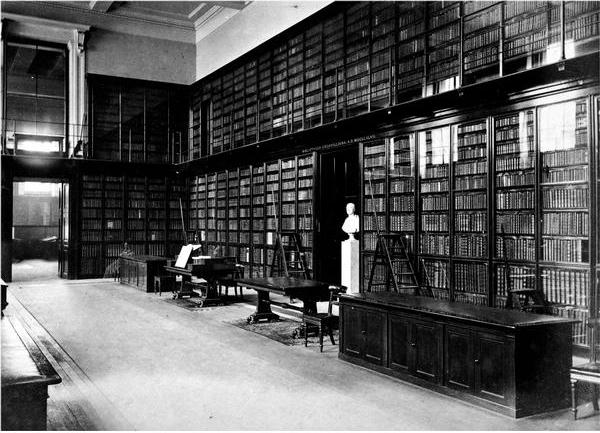
The Grenville Library, 1875

Sir Thomas Grenville (1755–1846), a trustee of the British Museum from 1830, assembled a library of 20,240 volumes, which he left to the museum in his will. The books arrived in January 1847 in twenty-one horse-drawn vans. The only vacant space for this large library was a room originally intended for manuscripts, between the Front Entrance Hall and the Manuscript Saloon. The books remained here until the British Library moved to St Pancras in 1998.

=== Collecting from the wider world (1850–1875) ===
The opening of the forecourt in 1852 marked the completion of Robert Smirke's 1823 plan, but already adjustments were having to be made to cope with the unforeseen growth of the collections. Infill galleries were constructed for Assyrian sculptures and Sydney Smirke's Round Reading Room, with space for a million books, opened in 1857. Because of continued pressure on space the decision was taken to move natural history to a new building in South Kensington, which would later become the British Museum of Natural History.

Roughly contemporary with the construction of the new building was the career of a man sometimes called the "second founder" of the British Museum, the Italian librarian Anthony Panizzi. Under his supervision, the British Museum Library (now part of the British Library) quintupled in size and became a well-organised institution worthy of being called a national library, the largest library in the world after the National Library of Paris. The quadrangle at the centre of Smirke's design proved to be a waste of valuable space and was filled at Panizzi's request by a circular Reading Room of cast iron, designed by Smirke's brother, Sydney Smirke.

Until the mid-19th century, the museum's collections were relatively circumscribed but, in 1851, with the appointment to the staff of Augustus Wollaston Franks to curate the collections, the museum began for the first time to collect British and European medieval antiquities, prehistory, branching out into Asia and diversifying its holdings of ethnography. A real coup for the museum was the purchase in 1867, over French objections, of the Duke of Blacas's wide-ranging and valuable collection of antiquities. Overseas excavations continued and John Turtle Wood discovered the remains of the 4th century BC Temple of Artemis at Ephesus, another Wonder of the Ancient World.

=== Scholarship and legacies (1875–1900) ===
The natural history collections were an integral part of the British Museum until their removal to the new British Museum of Natural History in 1887, nowadays the Natural History Museum in South Kensington. With the departure and the completion of the new White Wing (fronting Montague Street) in 1884, more space was available for antiquities and ethnography and the library could further expand. This was a time of innovation as electric lighting was introduced in the Reading Room and exhibition galleries.

The William Burges collection of armoury was bequeathed to the museum in 1881. In 1882, the museum was involved in the establishment of the independent Egypt Exploration Fund (now Society) the first British body to carry out research in Egypt. A bequest from Miss Emma Turner in 1892 financed excavations in Cyprus. In 1897 the death of the great collector and curator, A. W. Franks, was followed by an immense bequest of 3,300 finger rings, 153 drinking vessels, 512 pieces of continental porcelain, 1,500 netsuke, 850 inro, over 30,000 bookplates and miscellaneous items of jewellery and plate, among them the Oxus Treasure.

In 1898 Baron Ferdinand de Rothschild bequeathed the Waddesdon Bequest, the glittering contents from his New Smoking Room at Waddesdon Manor. This consisted of almost 300 pieces of objets d'art et de vertu which included exquisite examples of jewellery, plate, enamel, carvings, glass and maiolica, among them the Holy Thorn Reliquary, probably created in the 1390s in Paris for John, Duke of Berry. The collection was in the tradition of a Schatzkammer such as those formed by the Renaissance princes of Europe. Baron Ferdinand's will was most specific, and failure to observe the terms would make it void, the collection should be

placed in a special room to be called the Waddesdon Bequest Room separate and apart from the other contents of the Museum and thenceforth for ever thereafter, keep the same in such room or in some other room to be substituted for it.

These terms are still observed, and the collection occupies room 2a.

=== New century, new building (1900–1925) ===
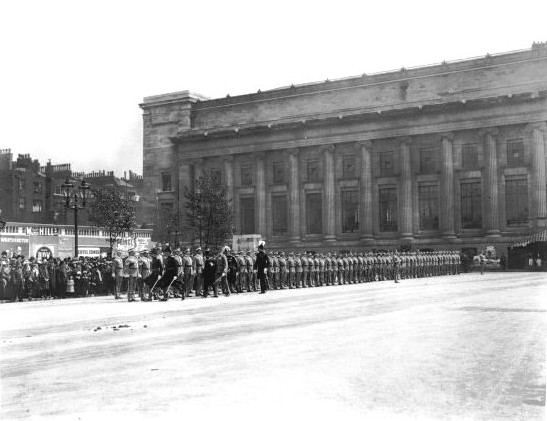
Opening of The North Wing, King Edward VII's Galleries, 1914

By the last years of the 19th century, The British Museum's collections had increased to the extent that its building was no longer large enough. In 1895 the trustees purchased the 69 houses surrounding the museum with the intention of demolishing them and building around the west, north and east sides of the museum. The first stage was the construction of the northern wing beginning 1906.

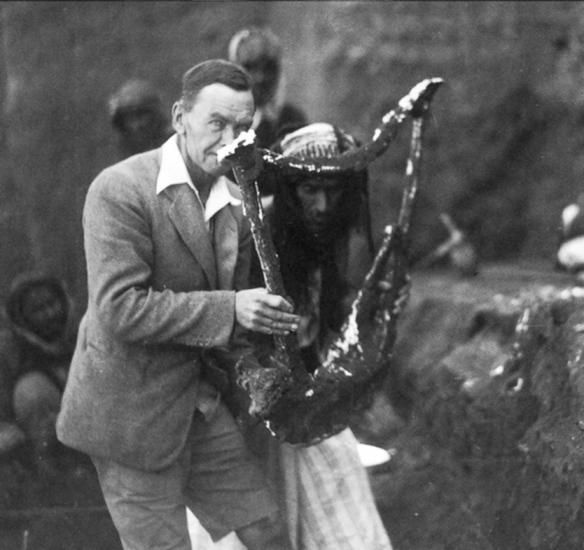
Sir Leonard Woolley holding a plaster cast of the Sumerian Queen's Lyre, 1922.

All the while, the collections kept growing. Emil Torday collected in Central Africa, Aurel Stein in Central Asia, D. G. Hogarth, Leonard Woolley and T. E. Lawrence excavated at Carchemish. Around this time, the American collector and philanthropist J. Pierpont Morgan donated a substantial number of objects to the museum, including William Greenwell's collection of prehistoric artefacts from across Europe which he had purchased for £10,000 in 1908. Morgan had also acquired a major part of Sir John Evans's coin collection, which was later sold to the museum by his son J. P. Morgan Jr. in 1915. In 1918, because of the threat of wartime bombing, some objects were evacuated via the London Post Office Railway to Holborn, the National Library of Wales (Aberystwyth) and a country house near Malvern. On the return of antiquities from wartime storage in 1919 some objects were found to have deteriorated. A conservation laboratory was set up in May 1920 and became a permanent department in 1931. It is today the oldest in continuous existence. In 1923, the British Museum welcomed over one million visitors.

=== Disruption and reconstruction (1925–1950) ===
New mezzanine floors were constructed and book stacks rebuilt in an attempt to cope with the flood of books. In 1931, the art dealer Sir Joseph Duveen offered funds to build a gallery for the Parthenon sculptures. Designed by the American architect John Russell Pope, it was completed in 1938. The appearance of the exhibition galleries began to change as dark Victorian reds gave way to modern pastel shades. (Note: Ashmole, the Keeper of the Greek and Roman Antiquities appreciated the original top-lighting of these galleries and removed the Victorian colour scheme, commenting: The old Elgin Gallery was painted a deep terracotta red, which, though in some ways satisfactory, diminished its apparent size, and was apt to produce a depressing effect on the visitor. It was decided to experiment with lighter colours, and the walls of the large room were painted with what was, at its first application, a pure cold white, but which after a year's exposure had unfortunately yellowed. The small Elgin Room was painted with pure white tinted with prussian blue, and the Room of the metopes was painted with pure white tinted with cobalt blue and black; it was necessary, for practical reasons, to colour all the dadoes a darker colour)

Following the retirement of Sir George Francis Hill as Director and Principal Librarian in 1936, he was succeeded by John Forsdyke.

As tensions with Nazi Germany developed and it appeared that war may be imminent Forsdyke came to the view that with the likelihood of far worse air-raids than that experienced in World War I that the museum had to make preparations to remove its most valuable items to secure locations. Following the Munich crisis Forsdyke ordered 3,300 No-Nail Boxes and stored them in the basement of the Duveen Gallery. At the same time he began identifying and securing suitable locations. As a result, the museum was able to quickly commence relocating selected items on 24 August 1939, (a mere day after the Home Secretary advised them to do so), to secure basements, country houses, Aldwych tube station and the National Library of Wales. Many items were relocated in early 1942 from their initial dispersal locations to a newly developed facility at Westwood Quarry in Wiltshire. The evacuation was timely, for in 1940 the Duveen Gallery was severely damaged by bombing. Meanwhile, prior to the war, the Nazis had sent a researcher to the British Museum for several years with the aim of "compiling an anti-Semitic history of Anglo-Jewry".

After the war, the museum continued to collect from all countries and all centuries: among the most spectacular additions were the 2600 BC Mesopotamian treasure from Ur, discovered during Leonard Woolley's 1922–34 excavations, gold, silver and garnet grave goods from the Anglo-Saxon ship burial at Sutton Hoo (1939) and late Roman silver tableware from Mildenhall, Suffolk (1946). The immediate post-war years were taken up with the return of the collections from protection and the restoration of the museum after the Blitz. Work also began on restoring the damaged Duveen Gallery.

=== New public face (1950–1975) ===
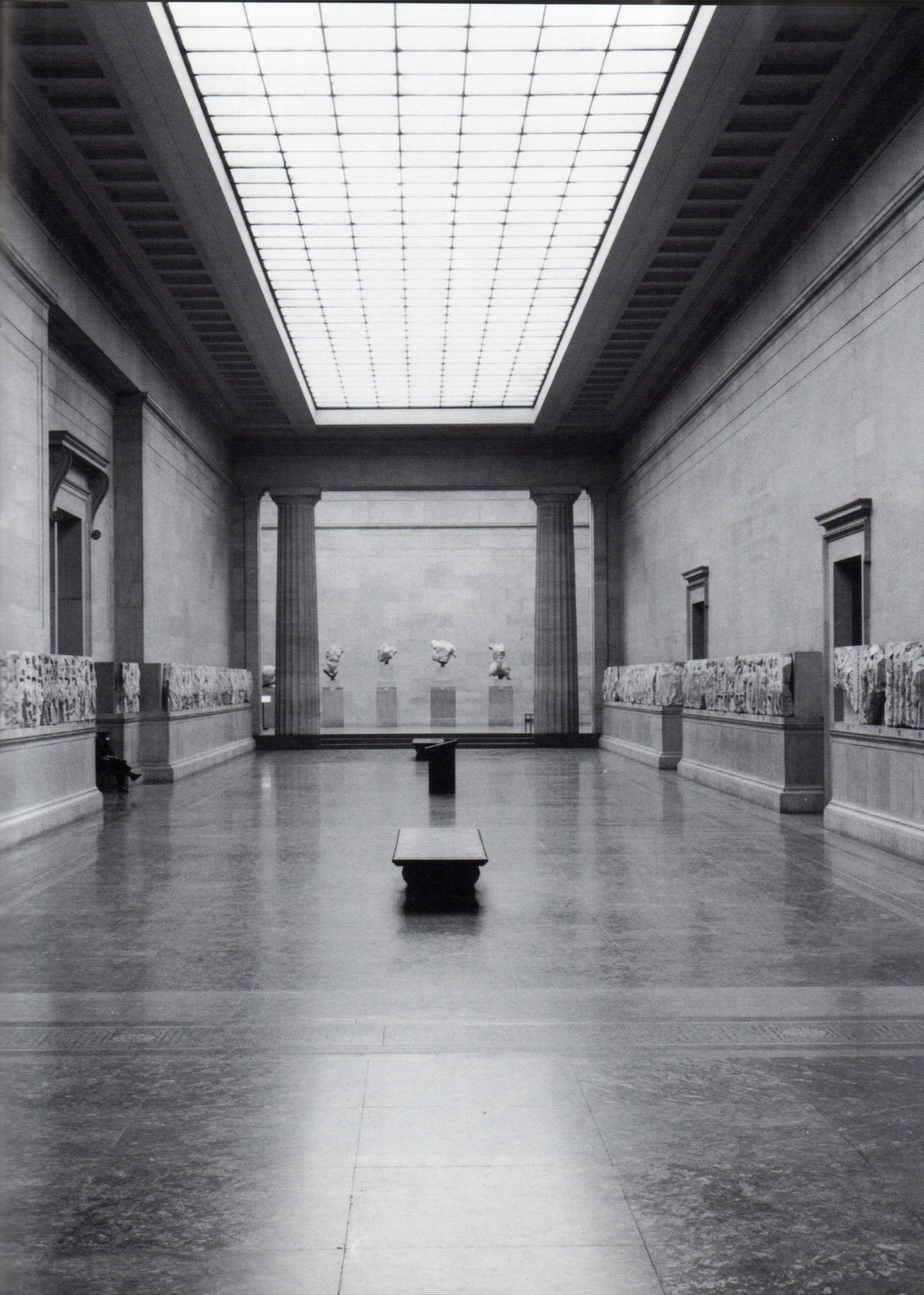
The re-opened Duveen Gallery, 1980

In 1953, the museum celebrated its bicentenary. Many changes followed: the first full-time in-house designer and publications officer were appointed in 1964, the Friends organisation was set up in 1968, an Education Service established in 1970 and publishing house in 1973. The British Museum Act 1963 introduced administrative reforms. It became easier to lend objects, the constitution of the board of trustees changed and the Natural History Museum became fully independent. By 1959 the Coins and Medals office suite, completely destroyed during the war, was rebuilt and re-opened, attention turned towards the gallery work with new tastes in design leading to the remodelling of Robert Smirke's Classical and Near Eastern galleries. In 1962 the Duveen Gallery was finally restored and the Parthenon Sculptures were moved back into it, once again at the heart of the museum. (Note: Ashmole had never liked the Duveen Gallery: It is, I suppose, not positively bad, but it could have been infinitely better. It is pretentious, in that it uses the ancient Marbles to decorate itself. This is a long outmoded idea, and the exact opposite of what a sculpture gallery should do. And, although it incorporates them, it is out of scale, and tends to dwarf them with its bogus Doric features, including those columns, supporting almost nothing which would have made an ancient Greek artist architect wince. The source of daylight is too high above the sculptures, a fault that is only concealed by the amount of reflection from the pinkish marble walls. These are too similar in colour to the marbles... These half-dozen elementary errors were pointed out by everyone in the Museum, and by many scholars outside, when the building was projected. It was not until the 1980s that the installation of a lighting scheme removed his greatest criticism of the building.)

By the 1970s, the museum was again expanding. More services for the public were introduced; visitor numbers soared, with the temporary exhibition "Treasures of Tutankhamun" in 1972, attracting 1,694,117 visitors, the most successful in British history. In the same year the British Library Act 1972 was passed, separating the collection of manuscripts and printed books from the British Museum. This left the museum with antiquities; coins, medals and paper money; prints and drawings; and ethnography. A pressing problem was finding space for additions to the library which now required an extra 1 1/4 miles (2.0 km) of shelving each year. The government suggested a site at St Pancras for the new British Library but the books did not leave the museum until 1997.

=== Great Court emerges (1975–2000) ===
The departure of the British Library to a new site at St Pancras, finally achieved in 1998, provided the space needed for the books. It also created the opportunity to redevelop the vacant space in Robert Smirke's 19th-century central quadrangle into the Queen Elizabeth II Great Court – the largest covered square in Europe – which opened in 2000. The ethnography collections, which had been housed in the short-lived Museum of Mankind at 6 Burlington Gardens from 1970, were returned to new purpose-built galleries in the museum in 2000.

The museum again readjusted its collecting policies as interest in "modern" objects: prints, drawings, medals and the decorative arts reawakened. Ethnographical fieldwork was carried out in places as diverse as New Guinea, Madagascar, Romania, Guatemala and Indonesia and there were excavations in the Near East, Egypt, Sudan and the UK. The Weston Gallery of Roman Britain, opened in 1997, displayed a number of recently discovered hoards which demonstrated the richness of what had been considered an unimportant part of the Roman Empire. The museum turned increasingly towards private funds for buildings, acquisitions and other purposes. In 2000, the British Museum was awarded National Heritage Museum of the Year.

=== British Museum today ===
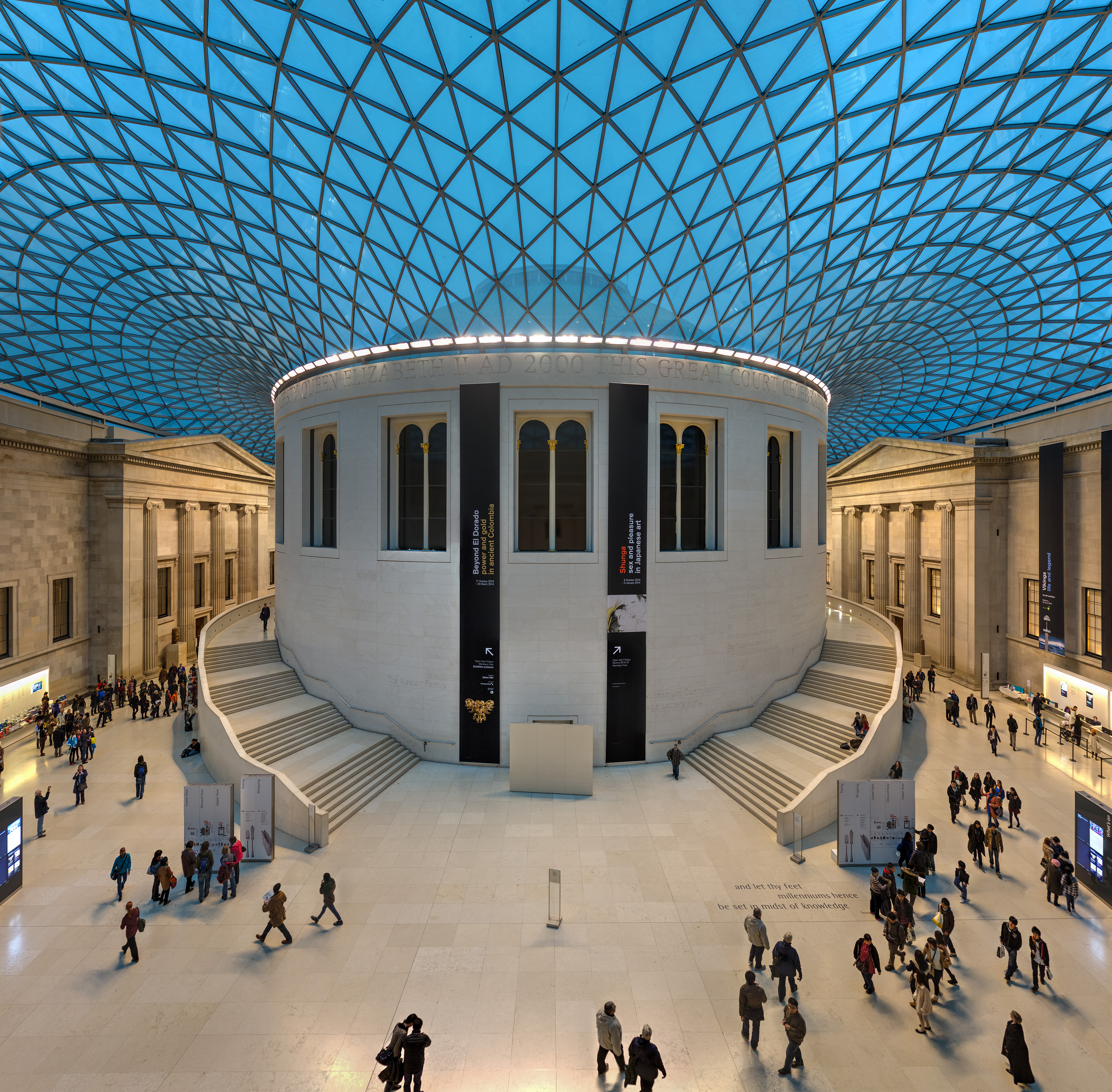
The Great Court was developed in 2001 and surrounds the original Reading Room.

Today the museum no longer houses collections of natural history, and the books and manuscripts it once held now form part of the independent British Library. The museum nevertheless preserves its universality in its collections of artefacts representing the cultures of the world, ancient and modern. The original 1753 collection has grown to over 13 million objects at the British Museum, 70 million at the Natural History Museum and 150 million at the British Library.

The Round Reading Room, which was designed by the architect Sydney Smirke, opened in 1857. For almost 150 years researchers came here to consult the museum's vast library. The Reading Room closed in 1997 when the national library (the British Library) moved to a new building at St Pancras.

With the bookstacks in the central courtyard of the museum empty, the demolition for Lord Foster's glass-roofed Great Court could begin. The Great Court, opened in 2000, while undoubtedly improving circulation around the museum, was criticised for having a lack of exhibition space at a time when the museum was in serious financial difficulties and many galleries were closed to the public. At the same time the African collections that had been temporarily housed in 6 Burlington Gardens were given a new gallery in the North Wing funded by the Sainsbury family – with the donation valued at £25 million.

The museum's online database had nearly 4,500,000 individual object entries in 2,000,000 records at the start of 2023. In 2022–23 there were 27 million visits to the website. This compares with 19.5 millions website visits in 2013.

The museum received 6,440,120 visitors in 2025, making it the second most popular attraction after the Natural History Museum.

A number of films have been shot at the British Museum.

== Governance ==
=== Director ===
The British Museum is a non-departmental public body sponsored by the Department for Culture, Media and Sport through a three-year funding agreement. Its head is the Director of the British Museum. The British Museum was run from its inception by a 'principal librarian' (when the book collections were still part of the museum), a role that was renamed 'director and principal librarian' in 1898, and 'director' in 1973 (on the separation of the British Library).

=== Trustees ===
A board of 25 trustees (with the director as their accounting officer for the purposes of reporting to Government) is responsible for the general management and control of the museum, in accordance with the British Museum Act 1963 and the Museums and Galleries Act 1992. Prior to the 1963 Act, it was chaired by the Archbishop of Canterbury, the Lord Chancellor and the Speaker of the House of Commons. Of the 25 trustees, 15 are appointed by the Prime Minister, one by the Crown, four by relevant industry bodies, with the remaining five appointed by other trustees. The board was formed on the museum's inception to hold its collections in trust for the nation without actually owning them themselves, and now fulfil a mainly advisory role. Trustee appointments are governed by the regulatory framework set out in the code of practice on public appointments issued by the Office of the Commissioner for Public Appointments.

== Building ==
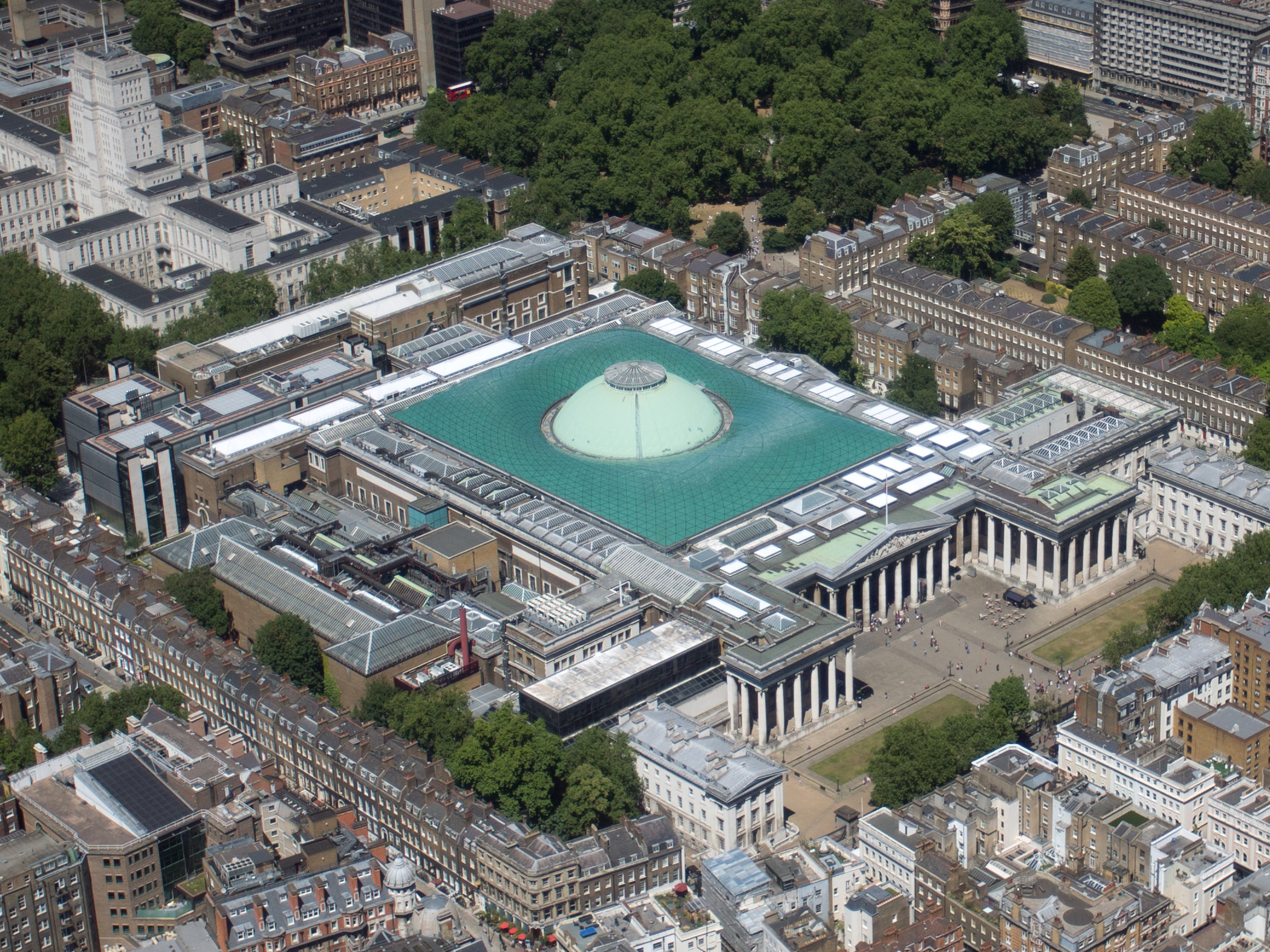
Aerial view of the British Museum in 2015

The Greek Revival façade facing Great Russell Street is a characteristic building of Sir Robert Smirke, with 43 columns in the Ionic order 45 ft (14 m) high, closely based on those of the temple of Athena Polias at Priene in Asia Minor. The pediment over the main entrance is decorated by sculptures by Sir Richard Westmacott depicting The Progress of Civilisation, consisting of fifteen allegorical figures, installed in 1852.

The construction commenced around the courtyard with the East Wing (King's Library) in 1823–1828, followed by the North Wing in 1833–1838, which originally housed among other galleries a reading room, now the Wellcome Gallery. Work was also progressing on the northern half of the West Wing (The Egyptian Sculpture Gallery) 1826–1831, with Montagu House demolished in 1842 to make room for the final part of the West Wing, completed in 1846, and the South Wing with its great colonnade, initiated in 1843 and completed in 1847, when the Front Hall and Great Staircase were opened to the public. The museum is faced with Portland stone, but the perimeter walls and other parts of the building were built using Haytor granite from Dartmoor in South Devon, transported via the unique Haytor Granite Tramway.

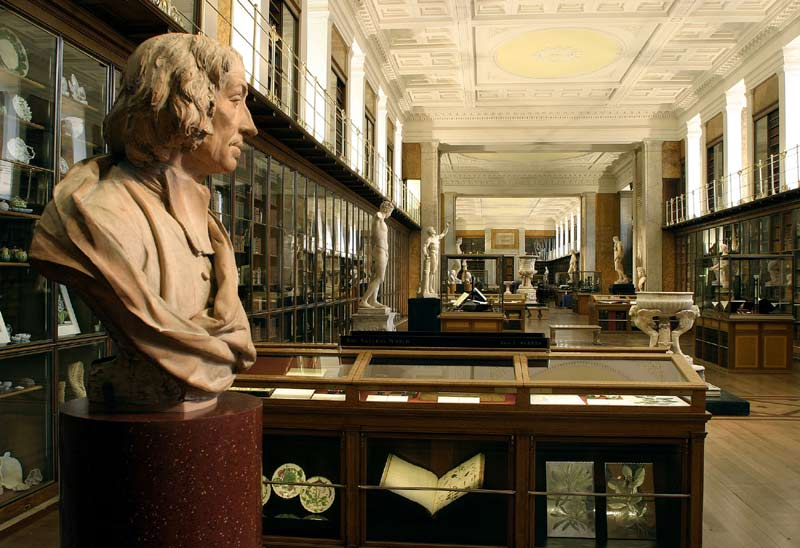
The Enlightenment Gallery at museum, which formerly held the King's Library, 2007

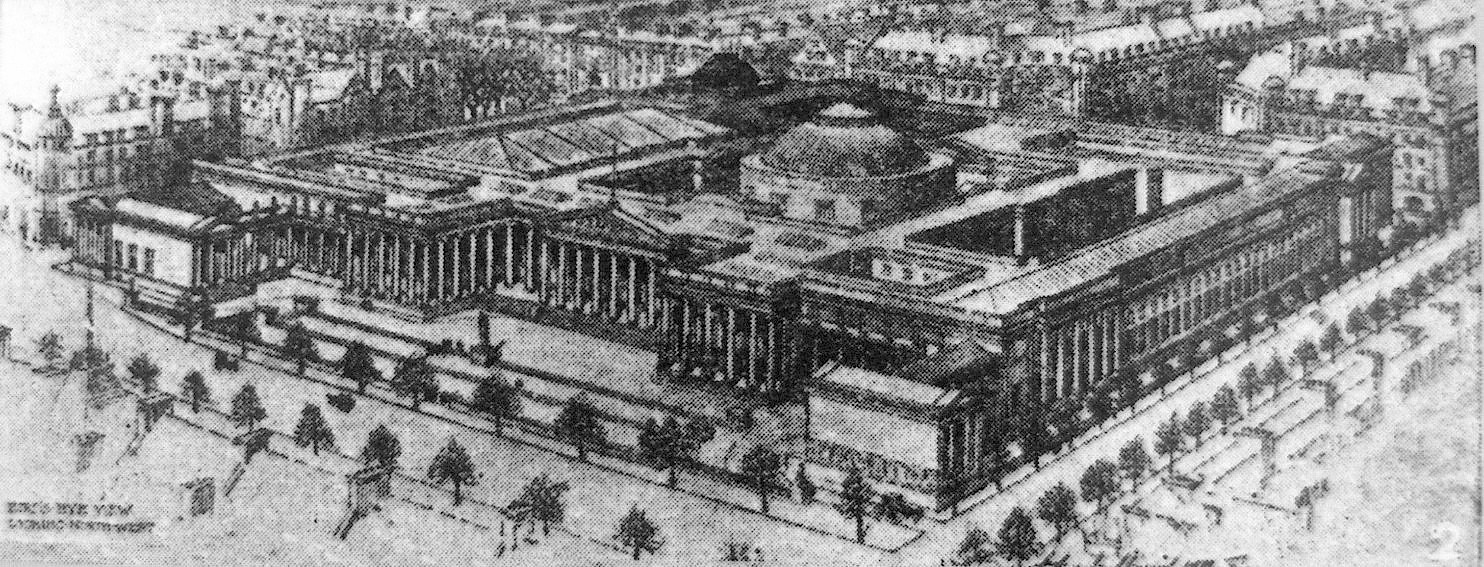
Proposed British Museum Extension, 1906

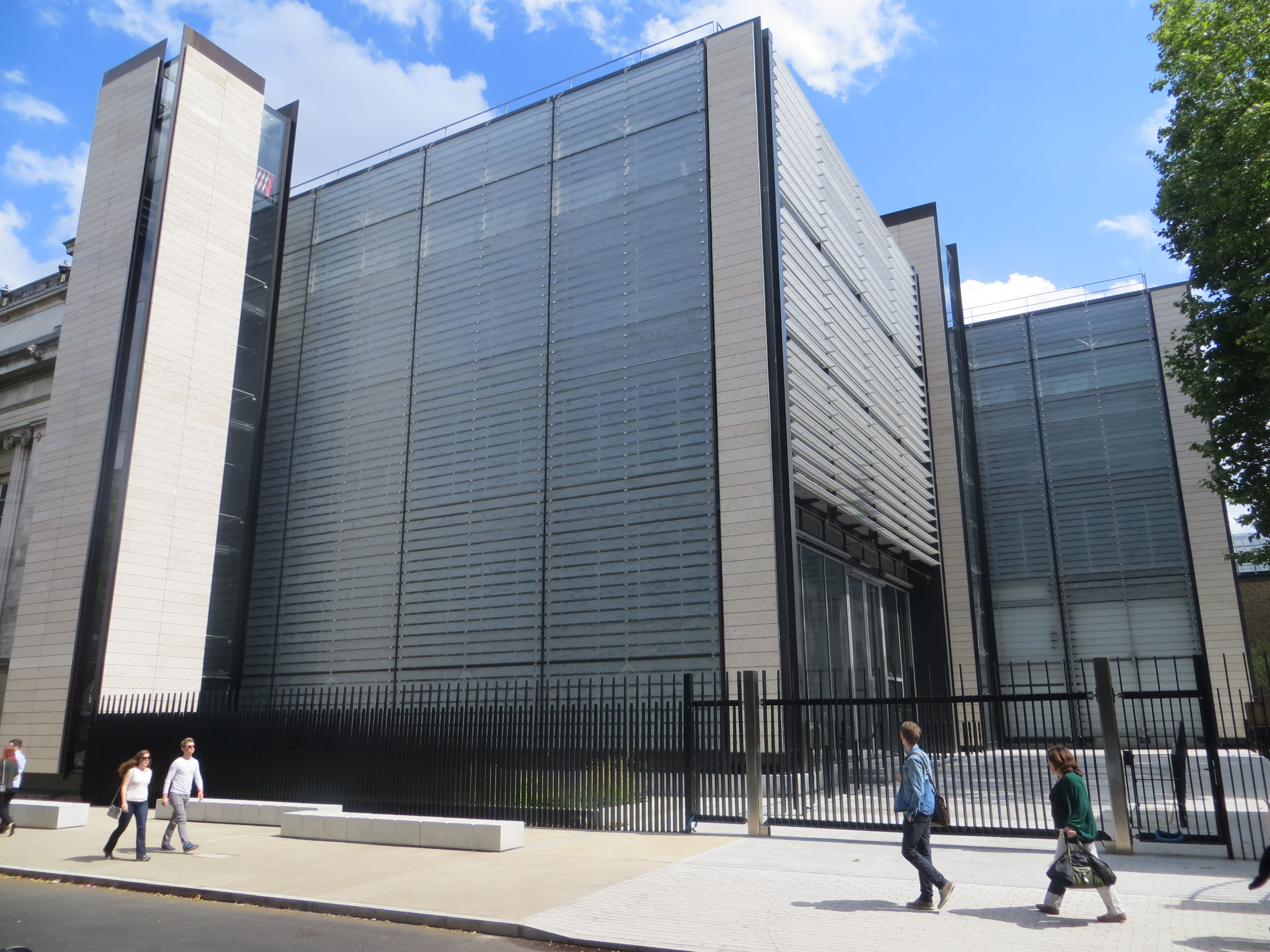
External view of the World Conservation and Exhibition Centre at the museum, 2015

In 1846 Robert Smirke was replaced as the museum's architect by his brother Sydney Smirke, whose major addition was the Round Reading Room 1854–1857; at 140 feet (43 m) in diameter it was then the second widest dome in the world, the Pantheon in Rome being slightly wider.

The next major addition was the White Wing 1882–1884 added behind the eastern end of the South Front, the architect being Sir John Taylor.

In 1895, Parliament gave the museum trustees a loan of £200,000 to purchase from the Duke of Bedford all 69 houses which backed onto the museum building in the five surrounding streets – Great Russell Street, Montague Street, Montague Place, Bedford Square and Bloomsbury Street. The trustees planned to demolish these houses and to build around the west, north and east sides of the museum new galleries that would completely fill the block on which the museum stands. The architect Sir John James Burnet was petitioned to put forward ambitious long-term plans to extend the building on all three sides. Most of the houses in Montague Place were knocked down a few years after the sale. Of this grand plan only the Edward VII galleries in the centre of the North Front were ever constructed, these were built 1906–14 to the design by J.J. Burnet, and opened by King George V and Queen Mary in 1914. They now house the museum's collections of Prints and Drawings and Oriental Antiquities. There was not enough money to put up more new buildings, and so the houses in the other streets are nearly all still standing.

The Duveen Gallery, sited to the west of the Egyptian, Greek & Assyrian sculpture galleries, was designed to house the Elgin Marbles by the American Beaux-Arts architect John Russell Pope. Although completed in 1938, it was hit by a bomb in 1940 and remained semi-derelict for 22 years, before reopening in 1962. Other areas damaged during World War II bombing included: in September 1940 two unexploded bombs hit the Edward VII galleries, the King's Library received a direct hit from a high explosive bomb, incendiaries fell on the dome of the Round Reading Room but did little damage; on the night of 10 to 11 May 1941 several incendiaries fell on the south-west corner of the museum, destroying the book stack and 150,000 books in the courtyard and the galleries around the top of the Great Staircase – this damage was not fully repaired until the early 1960s.

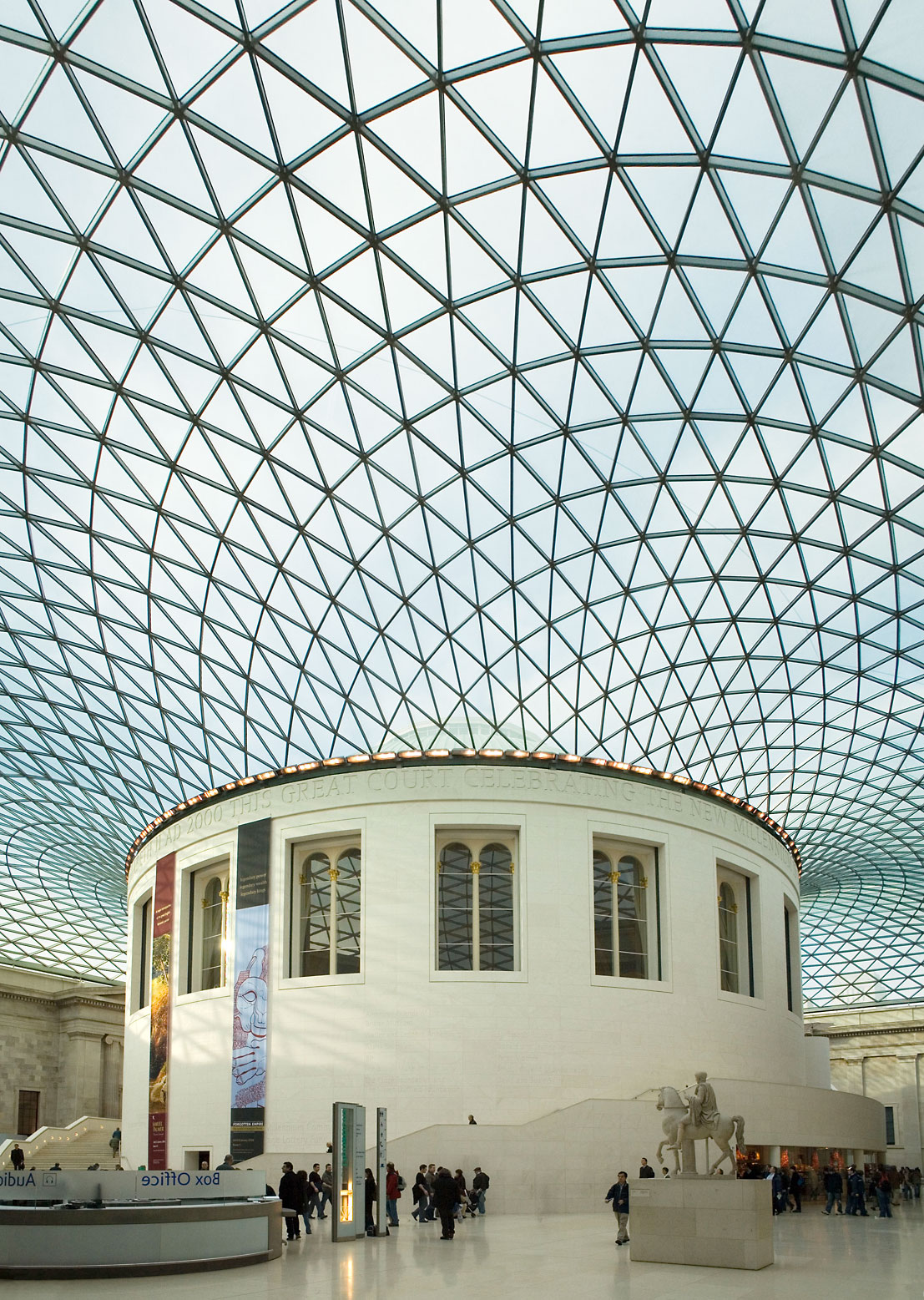
The Reading Room and Great Court roof, 2005

The Queen Elizabeth II Great Court is a covered square at the centre of the British Museum designed by the engineers Buro Happold and the architects Foster and Partners. The Great Court opened in December 2000 and is the largest covered square in Europe. The roof is a glass and steel construction, built by an Austrian steelwork company, with 1,656 uniquely shaped panes of glass. At the centre of the Great Court is the Reading Room vacated by the British Library, its functions now moved to St Pancras.

Today, the British Museum has grown to become one of the largest museums in the world, covering an area of over 92,000 m^{2} (990,000 sq. ft). In addition to 21,600 m^{2} (232,000 sq. ft) of on-site storage space, and 9,400 m^{2} (101,000 sq. ft) of external storage space. Altogether, the British Museum showcases on public display less than 1% of its entire collection, approximately 50,000 items.

There are nearly one hundred galleries open to the public, representing 2 miles (3.2 km) of exhibition space, although the less popular ones have restricted opening times. However, the lack of a large temporary exhibition space led to the £135 million World Conservation and Exhibitions Centre to provide one and to concentrate all the museum's conservation facilities into one centre. This project was announced in July 2007, with the architects Rogers Stirk Harbour and Partners. It was granted planning permission in December 2009 and was completed in time for the Viking exhibition in March 2014. In 2017, the World Conservation and Exhibitions Centre was shortlisted for the Stirling Prize for excellence in architecture.

Blythe House in West Kensington was used by the museum for off-site storage of small and medium-sized artefacts until the British Museum Archeological Collection, a purpose-built storage facility near Reading, was opened in 2024. Another site Franks House in East London is used for storage and work on the "Early Prehistory" – Palaeolithic and Mesolithic – and some other collections.

== Departments ==
=== Department of Egypt and Sudan ===
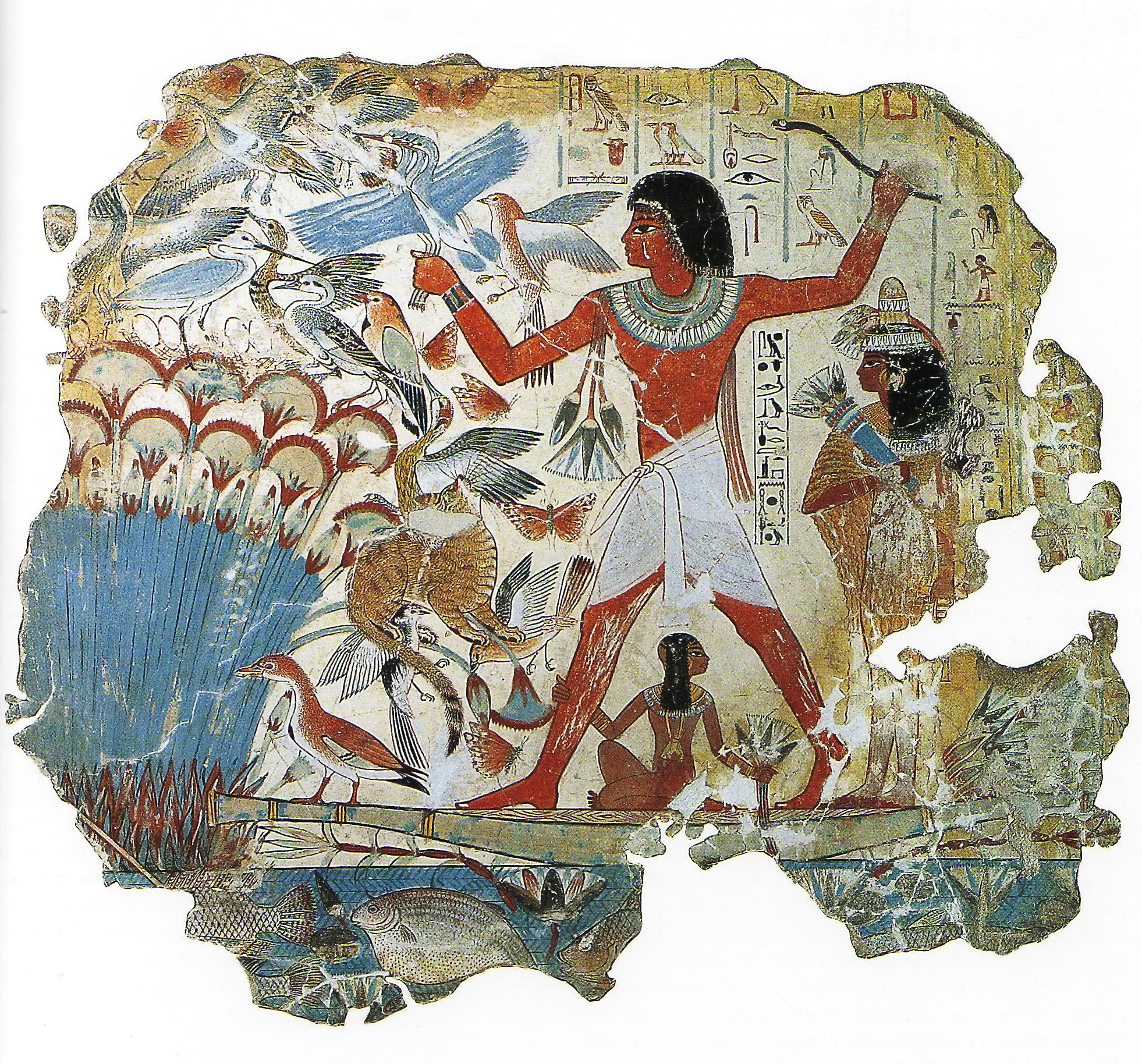
Room 61 – The famous fresco-secco 'Pond in a Garden' from the Tomb of Nebamun, c. 1350 BC

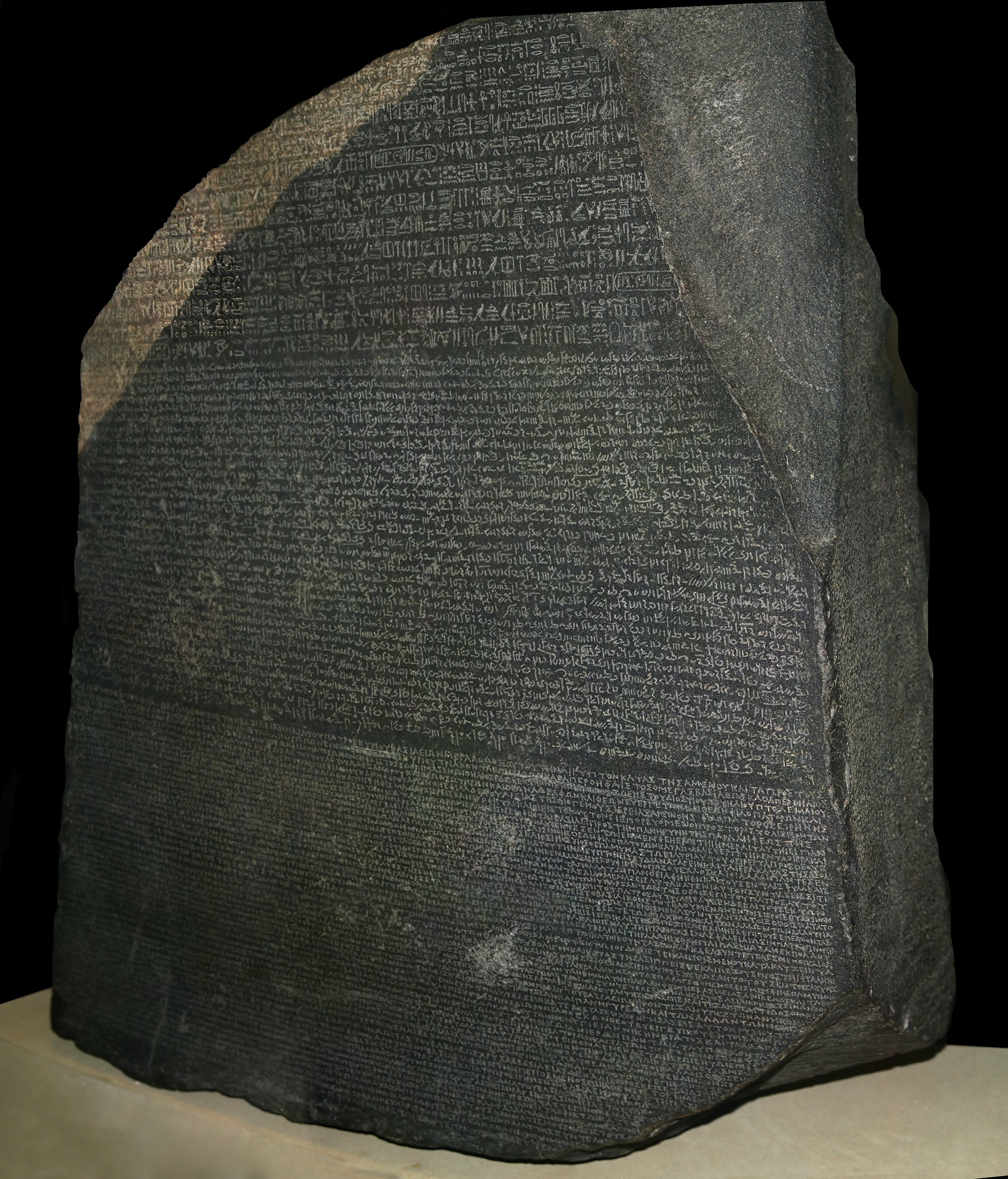
Room 4 – The Rosetta Stone, key to the decipherment of Egyptian hieroglyphs, 196 BC

The British Museum houses a collection of over 100,000 Egyptian antiquities from all periods and many sites of importance in Egypt and the Sudan. Together, they illustrate every aspect of the cultures of the Nile Valley (including Nubia), from the Predynastic Neolithic period (c. 10,000 BC) through Coptic (Christian) times (12th century AD), and up to the present day, a time-span over 11,000 years.

Egyptian antiquities have formed part of the British Museum collection ever since its foundation in 1753 after receiving 160 Egyptian objects from Sir Hans Sloane. After the defeat of the French forces under Napoleon at the Battle of the Nile in 1801, the Egyptian antiquities collected were confiscated by the British army and presented to the British Museum in 1803. These works, which included the famed Rosetta Stone, were the first important group of large sculptures to be acquired by the museum. Thereafter, the UK appointed Henry Salt as consul in Egypt who amassed a huge collection of antiquities, some of which were assembled and transported with great ingenuity by the famous Italian explorer Giovanni Belzoni. Most of the antiquities Salt collected were purchased by the British Museum and the Musée du Louvre.

By 1866, the collection consisted of some 10,000 objects. Antiquities from excavations started to come to the museum in the latter part of the 19th century as a result of the work of the Egypt Exploration Fund under the efforts of E. A. Wallis Budge. Over the years more than 11,000 objects came from this source, including pieces from Amarna, Bubastis and Deir el-Bahari. Other organisations and individuals also excavated and donated objects to the British Museum, including Flinders Petrie's Egypt Research Account and the British School of Archaeology in Egypt, as well as the University of Oxford Expedition to Kawa and Faras in Sudan.

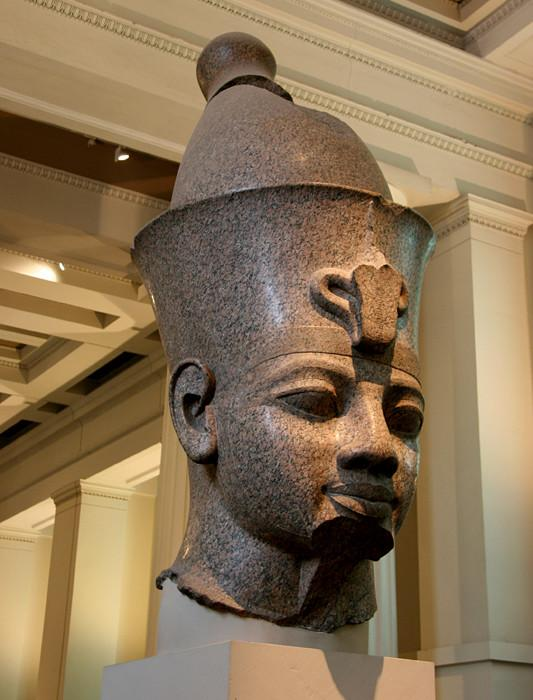
Room 4 – Colossal red granite statue of Amenhotep III, 1350 BC

Active support by the museum for excavations in Egypt continued to result in important acquisitions throughout the 20th century until changes in antiquities laws in Egypt led to the suspension of policies allowing finds to be exported, although divisions still continue in Sudan. The British Museum conducted its own excavations in Egypt where it received divisions of finds, including Asyut (1907), Mostagedda and Matmar (1920s), Ashmunein (1980s) and sites in Sudan such as Soba, Kawa and the Northern Dongola Reach (1990s). The size of the Egyptian collections now stand at over 110,000 objects.

In autumn 2001, the eight million objects forming the museum's permanent collection were further expanded by the addition of six million objects from the Wendorf Collection of Egyptian and Sudanese Prehistory. These were donated by Professor Fred Wendorf of Southern Methodist University in Texas, and comprise the entire collection of artefacts and environmental remains from his excavations at Prehistoric sites in the Sahara Desert between 1963 and 1997. Other fieldwork collections have recently come from Dietrich and Rosemarie Klemm of LMU Munich, and William Adams of the University of Kentucky.

The seven permanent Egyptian galleries at the British Museum, which include its largest exhibition space (Room 4, for monumental sculpture), can display only 4% of its Egyptian holdings. The second-floor galleries have a selection of the museum's collection of 140 mummies and coffins, the largest outside Cairo. A high proportion of the collection comes from tombs or contexts associated with the cult of the dead, and it is these pieces, in particular the mummies, that remain among the most eagerly sought-after exhibits by visitors to the museum.

Highlights of the collections include:

Predynastic and Early Dynastic period (c. 6000 BC – c. 2690 BC)

- Mummy of Ginger and five other individuals from Gebelein (c. 3400 BC)
- Flint knife with an ivory handle (known as the Pit-Rivers Knife), Sheikh Hamada, Egypt (c. 3100 BC)
- The Battlefield Palette and Hunters Palette, two cosmetic palettes with complex decorative schemes (c. 3100 BC)
- Ivory statuette of a king, from the early temple at Abydos, Egypt (c. 3000 BC)
- King Den's sandal label from Abydos, mid-1st Dynasty (c. 2985 BC)
- Stela of King Peribsen, Abydos (c. 2720–2710 BC)

Old Kingdom (2690–2181 BC)

- Artefacts from the tomb of King Khasekhemwy from the 2nd Dynasty (2690 BC)
- Granite statue of Ankhwa, the shipbuilder, Saqqara, Egypt, 3rd Dynasty (c. 2650 BC)
- Several of the original casing stones from the Great Pyramid of Giza, one of the Seven Wonders of the Ancient World (c. 2570 BC)
- Small dolerite ball and copper hook from the Queen's Chamber of the Great Pyramid of Giza, 4th Dynasty (c. 2570 BC)
- Limestone false door of Ptahshepses, Saqqara (2440 BC)
- Abusir Papyri, some of the oldest papyri from ancient Egypt, Abusir (2400 BC)
- Wooden tomb statue of Tjeti, 5th to 6th Dynasty (c. 2345–2181 BC)
- Statue of Nenkhefetkai from Dishasha, 6th Dynasty (c. 2200 BC)

Middle Kingdom (2134–1690 BC)

- Inner and outer coffin of Sebekhetepi, Beni Hasan (c. 2125–1795 BC)
- Quartzite statue of Ankhrekhu, 12th Dynasty (1985–1795 BC)
- Limestone stela of Heqaib, Abydos, Egypt, 12th Dynasty (1990–1750 BC)
- Block statue and stela of Sahathor, 12th Dynasty, reign of Amenemhat II (1922–1878 BC)
- Limestone statue and stelae from the offering chapel of Inyotef, Abydos, 12th Dynasty (c. 1920 BC)
- Stela of Samontu, Abydos (1910 BC)
- Reliefs from the tomb of Djehutyhotep, Deir-el-Bersha (1878–1855 BC)
- Three Granite statues of Senwosret III, Deir el-Bahri (1850 BC)
- Statue of Rehuankh, Abydos (1850–1830 BC)
- Colossal head of Amenemhat III, Bubastis (1800 BC)
- Stela of Nebipusenwosret, Abydos (1800 BC)

Second Intermediate Period (1650–1550 BC)

- Coffin of King Nubkheperre Intef, Thebes (1570 BC)
- The famous Rhind Mathematical Papyrus, an early example of Ancient Egyptian mathematics, Thebes (1550 BC)

New Kingdom (1549–1069 BC)

- Schist head of Pharaoh Hatshepsut or her successor Tuthmosis III (1480 BC)
- Statue of Senenmut with Princess Neferure on his lap, Karnak (1470 BC)
- Block statue of Sennefer, Western Thebes (1430 BC)
- Twenty Sekhmet statues from the Temple of Mut, Thebes (1400 BC)
- Fragment of the beard of the Great Sphinx of Giza (14th century BC)
- Pair of granite monumental lion statues from Soleb in Sudan, (1370 BC)
- Hoard of silver bullion from El-Amarna (1352–1336 BC)
- Colossal head from a statue of Amenhotep III (1350 BC)
- Colossal limestone bust of Amenhotep III (1350 BC)
- Amarna Tablets, 99 out of 382 tablets found, second largest collection in the world after the Vorderasiatisches Museum, Berlin (203 tablets) (1350 BC)
- Stela of Horemheb from his tomb at Saqqara (1330 BC)
- London Medical Papyrus with 61 medical and magical treatments (1300 BC)
- Papyrus of Ani, one of the finest extant Book of the Dead from antiquity, Thebes (1275 BC)
- List of the kings of Egypt from the Temple of Ramesses II (1250 BC)
- Statue of Khaemwaset, son of Ramses II, Abydos (1250 BC)
- The Great Harris Papyrus, the longest surviving papyrus from antiquity, Thebes (1200 BC)
- D'Orbiney Papyrus with the Tale of Two Brothers (1200–1194 BC)
- Seated statue of Seti II, Temple of Mut, Karnak (1200–1194 BC)
- Face from the sarcophagus of Ramses VI, Valley of the Kings (1140 BC)
- Book of the Dead of Nedjmet with painted offering-vignettes and columns of Hieroglyphic text, Deir el-Bahari (1070 BC)

Third Intermediate Period (1069–664 BC)

- Greenfield papyrus, funerary papyrus of Princess Nesitanebetashru, daughter of Pinudjem II and Neskhons, and priestess of Amen-Ra at Thebes (950–930 BC)
- Pair of gold bracelets that belonged to General Nemareth, son of Shoshenq I, Sais (940 BC)
- Colossal column capital of Hathor from Bubastis, 22nd Dynasty (922–887 BC)
- Statue of the Nile god Hapi, Karnak (c. 900 BC)
- Mummy case and coffin of Nesperennub, Thebes (c. 800 BC)
- Shabaka Stone from Memphis, Egypt, 25th Dynasty (c. 700 BC)
- Coffin of king Menkaure, Giza (700–600 BC)
- One of the three statues of Amun in the form of a ram protecting King Taharqo, Kawa (683 BC)
- Inner and outer coffins of the priest Hor, Deir el-Bahari, Thebes, 25th Dynasty (c. 680 BC)
- Granite statue of the Sphinx of Taharqo (680 BC)

Late Period (664–332 BC)

- Saite Sarcophagus of Sasobek, the vizier (prime minister) of the northern part of Egypt in the reign of Psammetichus I (664–610 BC)
- Sarcophagus lid of Sasobek (630 BC)
- Bronze figure of Isis and Horus, North Saqqara, Egypt (600 BC)
- Sarcophagus of Hapmen, Cairo, 26th Dynasty or later (600–300 BC)
- Kneeling statue of Wahibre, from near Lake Mariout (530 BC)
- Sarcophagus of Ankhnesneferibre (525 BC)
- Torso of Nectanebo I (380–362 BC)
- Obelisks and sarcophagus of Pharaoh Nectanebo II (360–343 BC)
- Sarcophagus of Nectanebo II, Alexandria (360–343 BC)

Ptolemaic dynasty (305–30 BC)

- The famous Rosetta Stone, trilingual stela that unlocked the ancient Egyptian hieroglyphics (196 BC)
- Naos or temple shrine of Ptolemy VIII from Philae (150 BC)
- Giant sculpture of a scarab beetle (32–30 BC)
- Fragment of a basalt Egyptian-style statue of Ptolemy I Soter (305–283 BC)
- Mummy of Hornedjitef (inner coffin), Thebes (3rd century BC)
- Wall from a chapel of Queen Shanakdakhete, Meroë (c. 150 BC)
- Shrine of Ptolemy VII, Philae (c. 150 BC)

Roman Period (30 BC – 641 AD)

- Schist head of a young man, Alexandria (after 30 BC)
- The Meriotic Hamadab Stela from the Kingdom of Kush found near the ancient site of Meroë in Sudan, 24 BC
- Lid of the coffin of Soter and Cleopatra from Qurna, Thebes (early 2nd century AD)
- Mummy of a youth with a portrait of the deceased, Hawara (100–200 AD)
- Over 30 Fayum mummy portraits from Hawara and other sites in Fayum (40–250 AD)
- Bronze lamp and patera from the X-group tombs, Qasr Ibrim (1st–6th centuries AD)
- Coptic wall painting of the martyrdom of saints, Wadi Sarga (6th century AD)
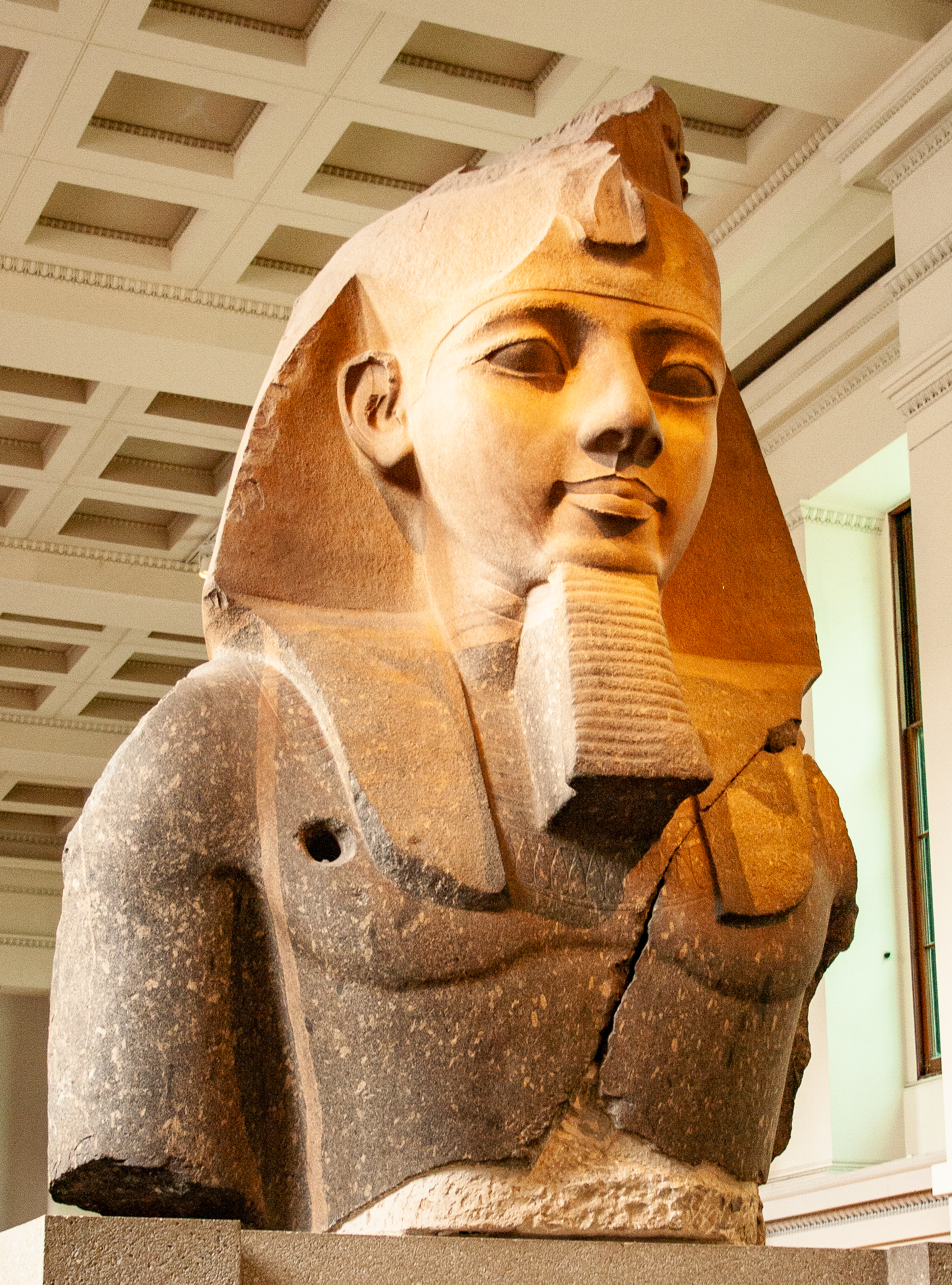
Room 4 – Colossal bust of Ramesses II, known as the Younger Memnon, c. 1250 BC

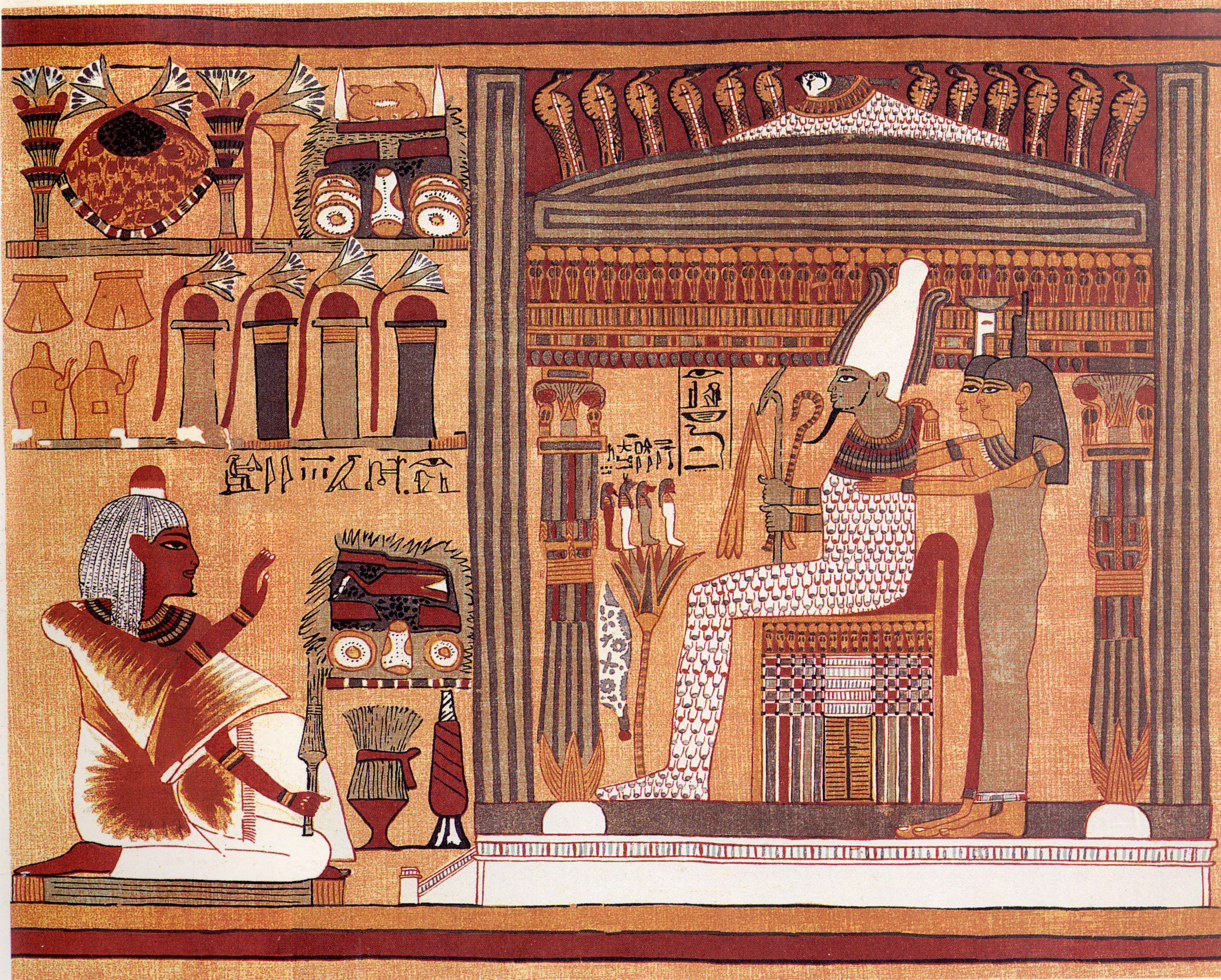
Ani before Osiris, from the Book of the Dead of Ani, c. 1300 BC

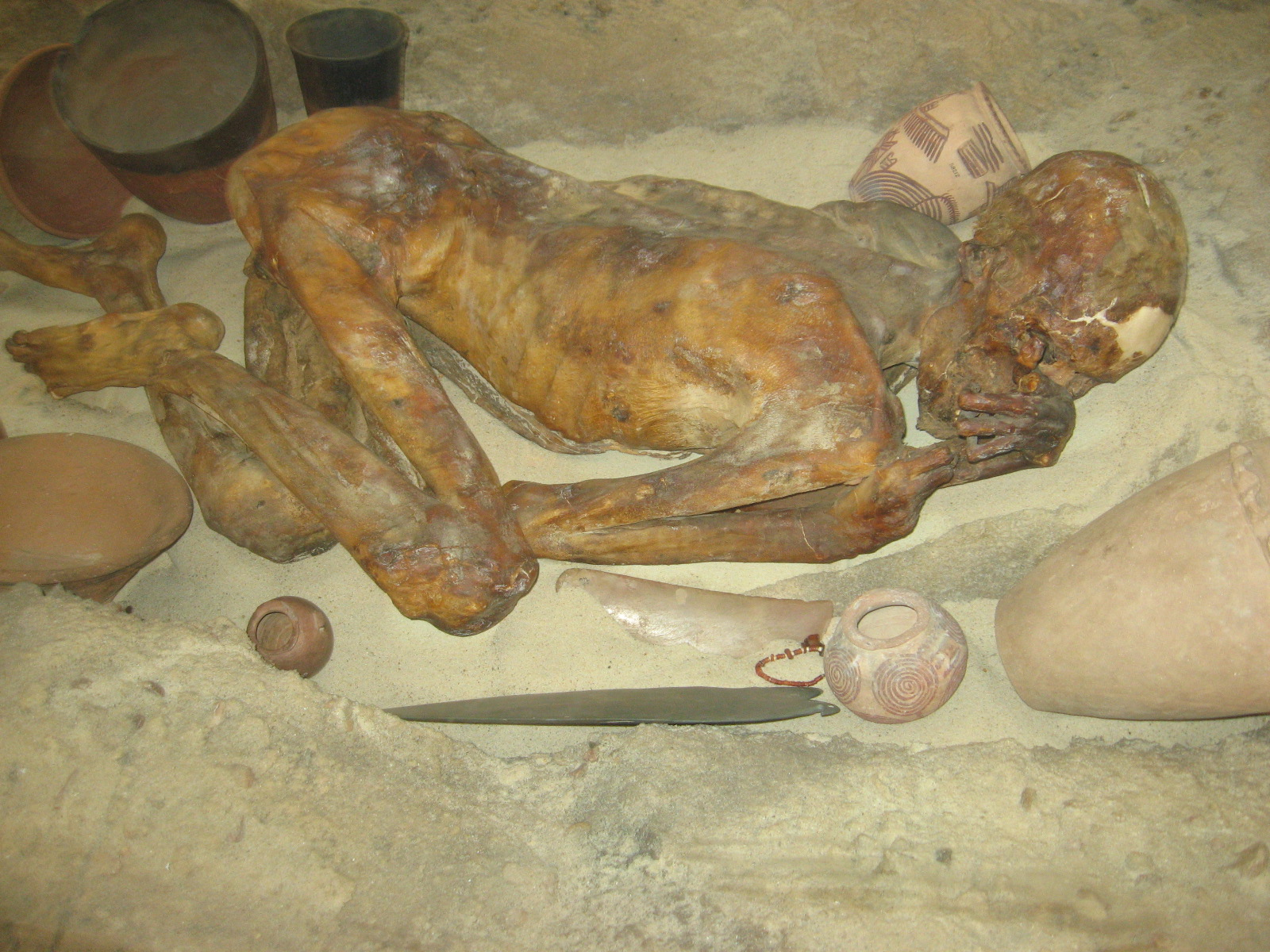
Room 64 – Egyptian grave containing a Gebelein predynastic mummy, late predynastic, 3400 BC

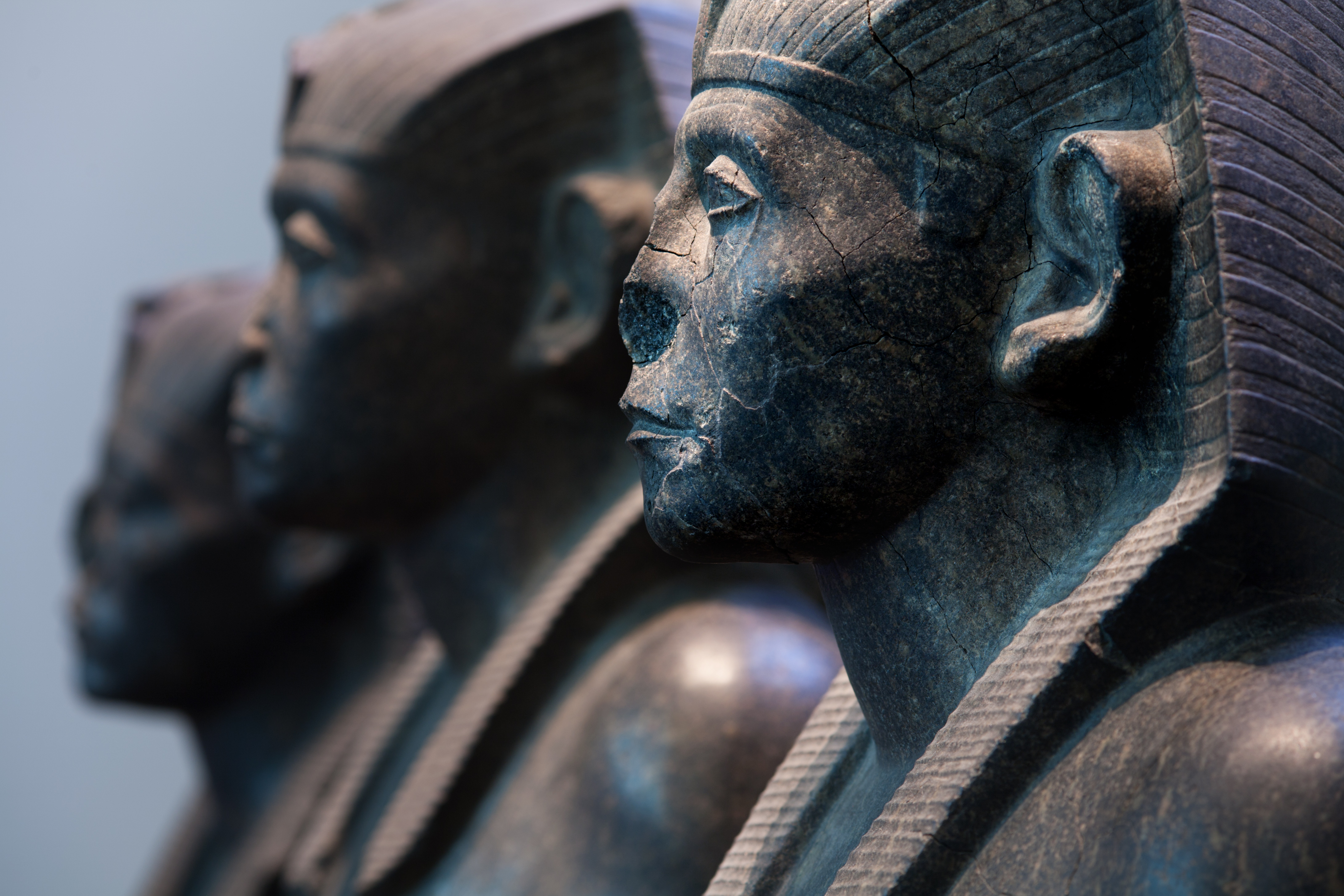
Room 4 – Three black granite statues of the pharaoh Senusret III, c. 1850 BC

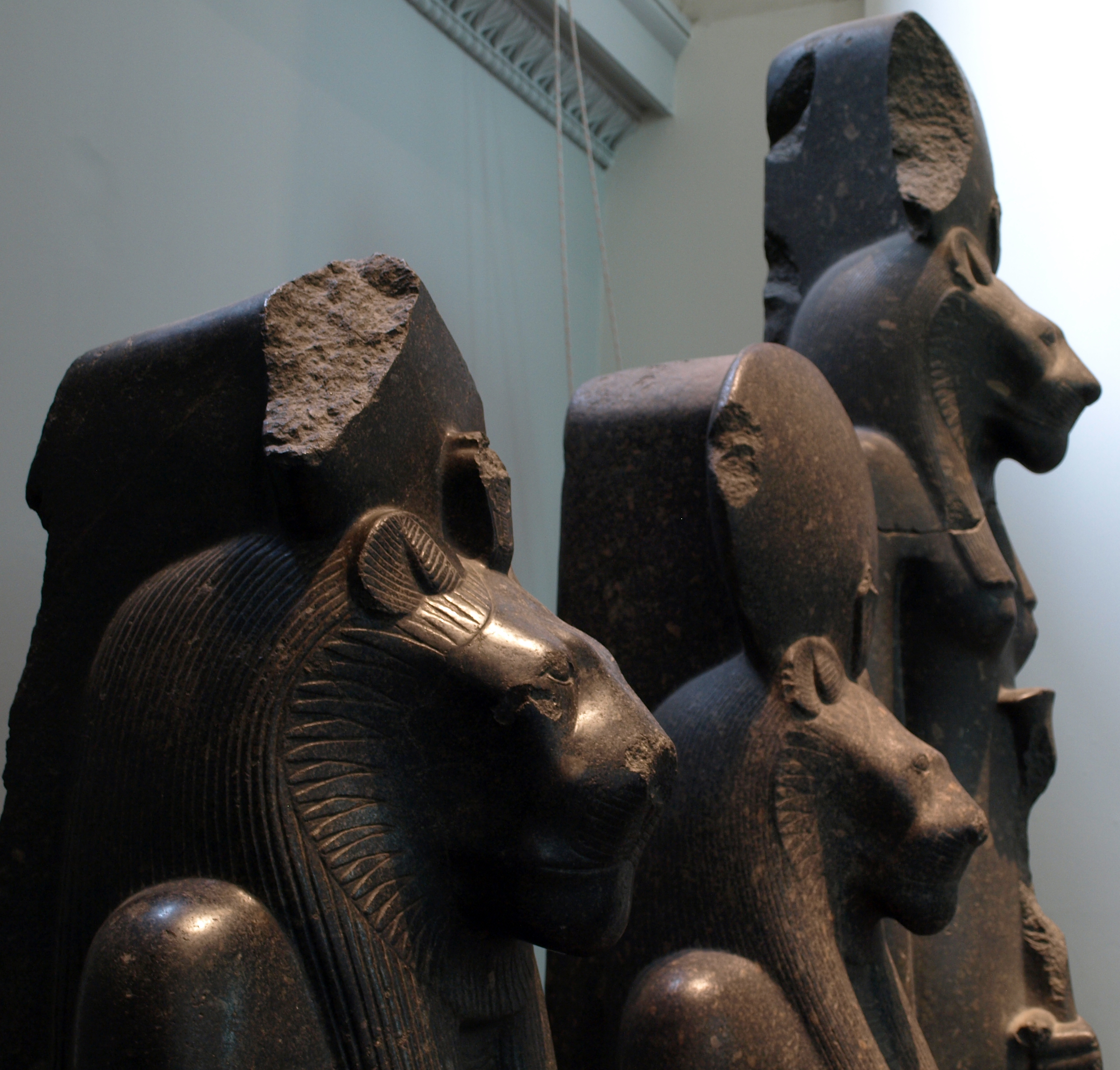
Room 4 – Three black granite statues of the goddess Sakhmet, c. 1400 BC

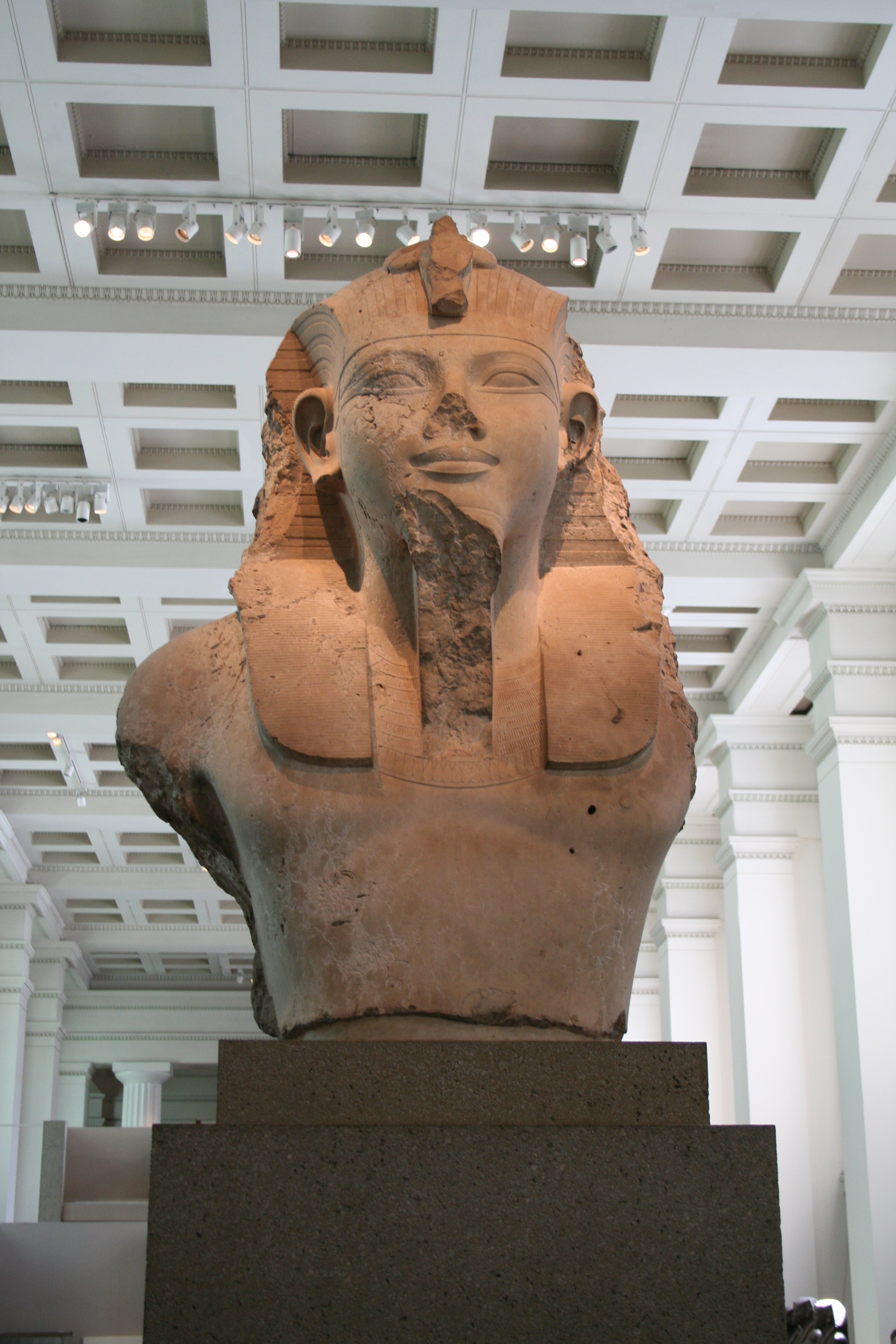
Room 4 – Colossal statue of Amenhotep III, c. 1370 BC

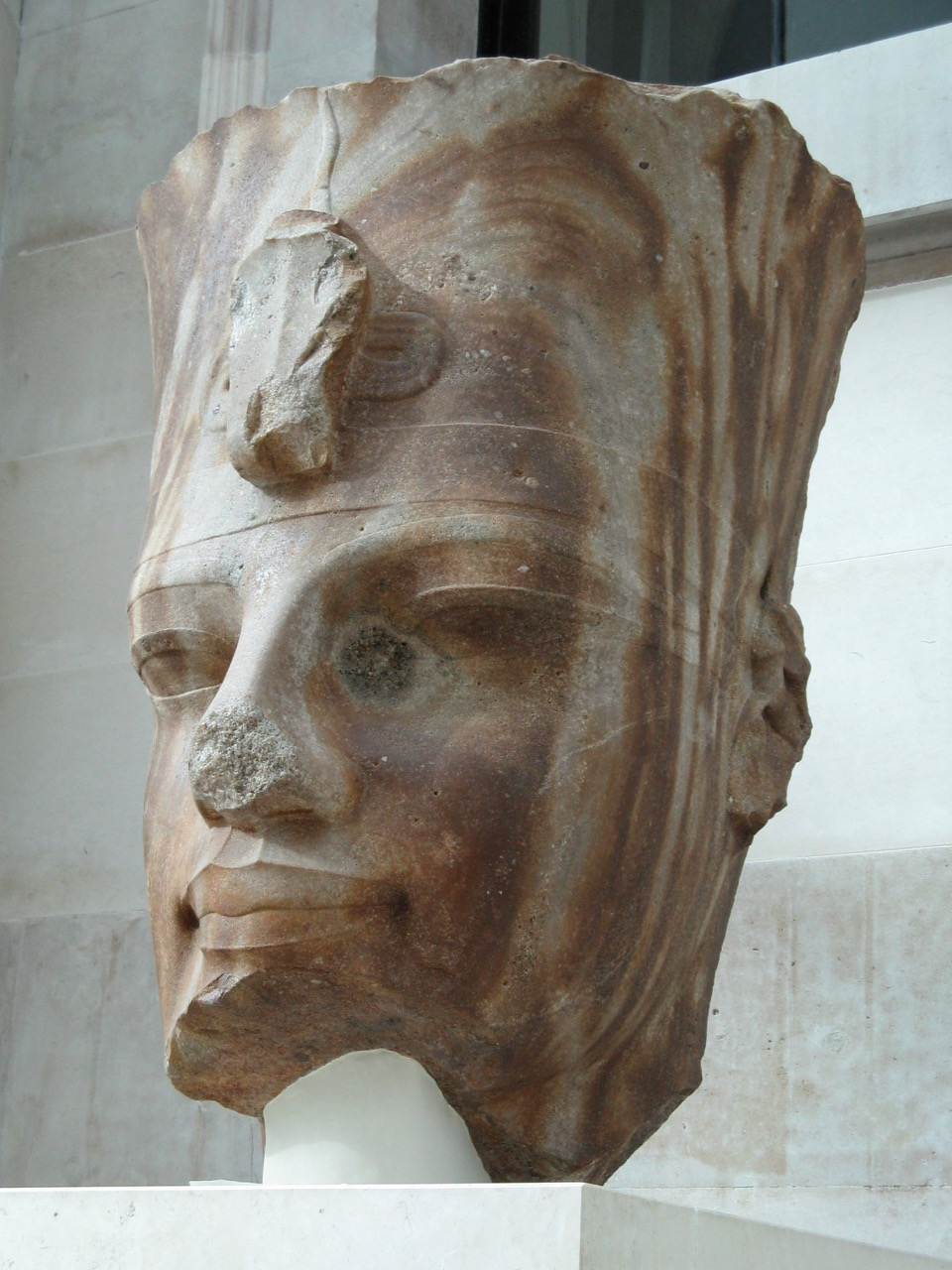
Great Court – Colossal quartzite statue of Amenhotep III, c. 1350 BC

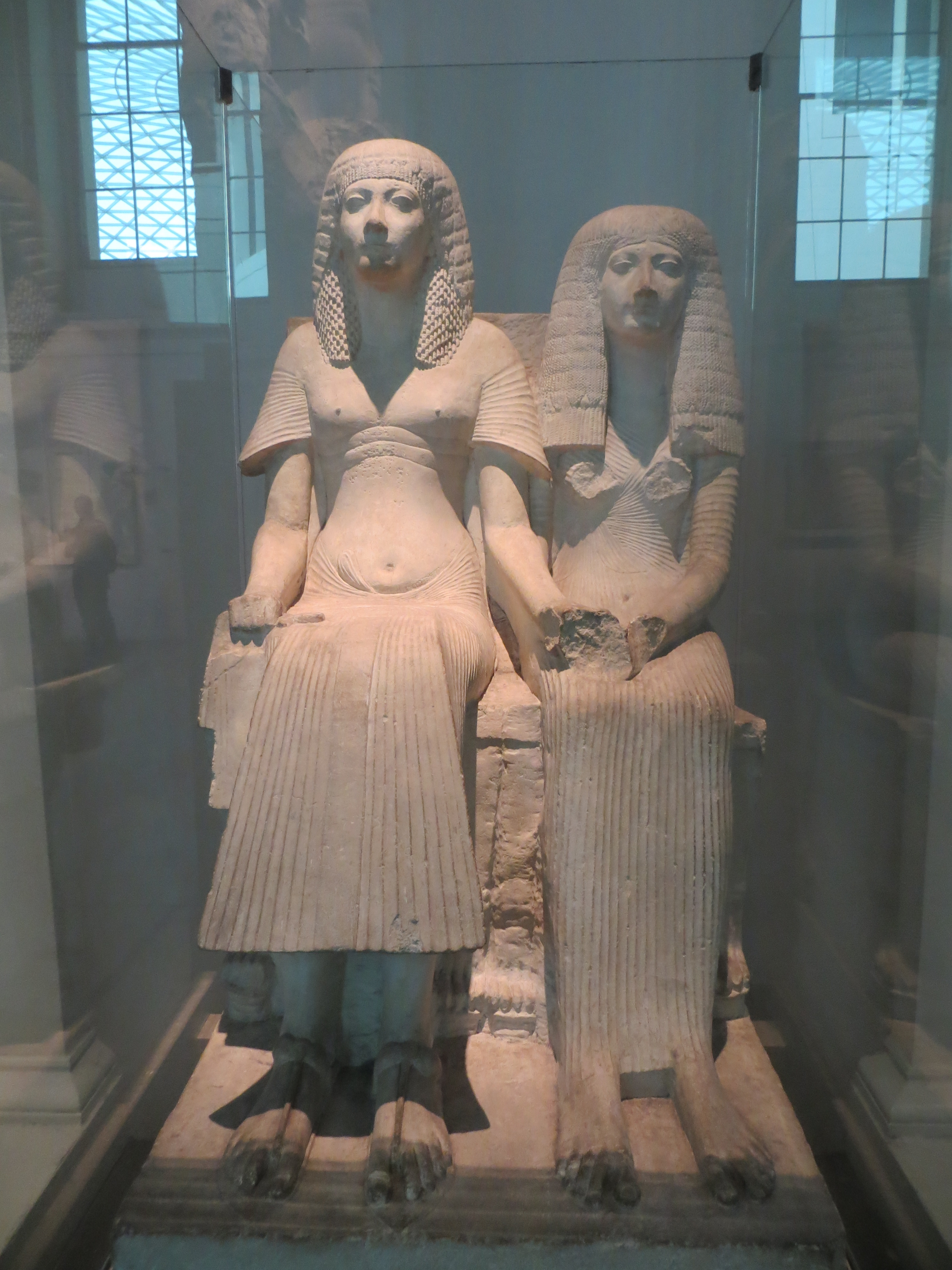
Room 4 – Limestone statue of a husband and wife, 1300–1250 BC

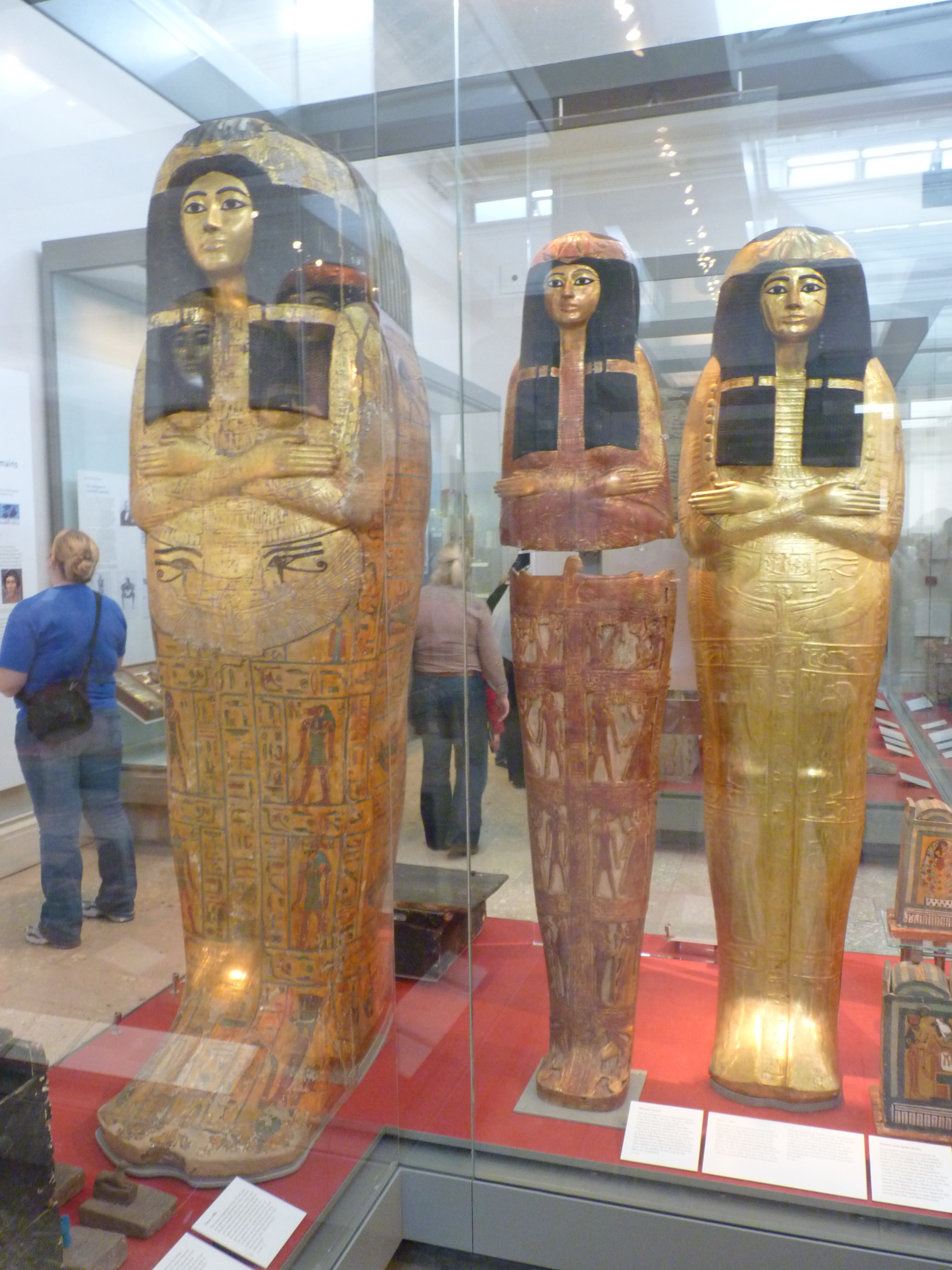
Room 63 – Gilded outer coffins from the tomb of Henutmehyt, Thebes, Egypt, 19th Dynasty, 1250 BC

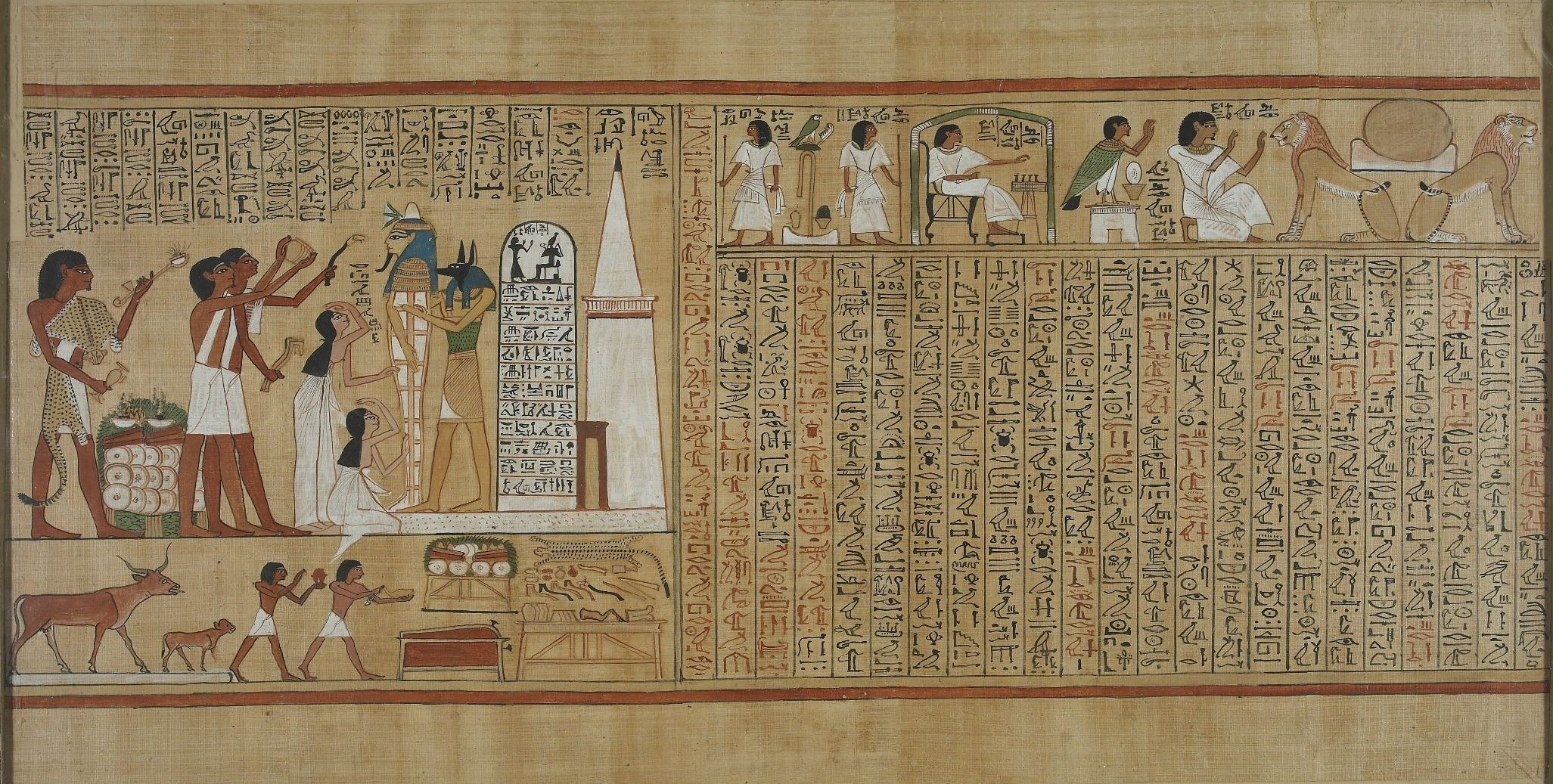
Book of the Dead of Hunefer, sheet 5, 19th Dynasty, 1250 BC

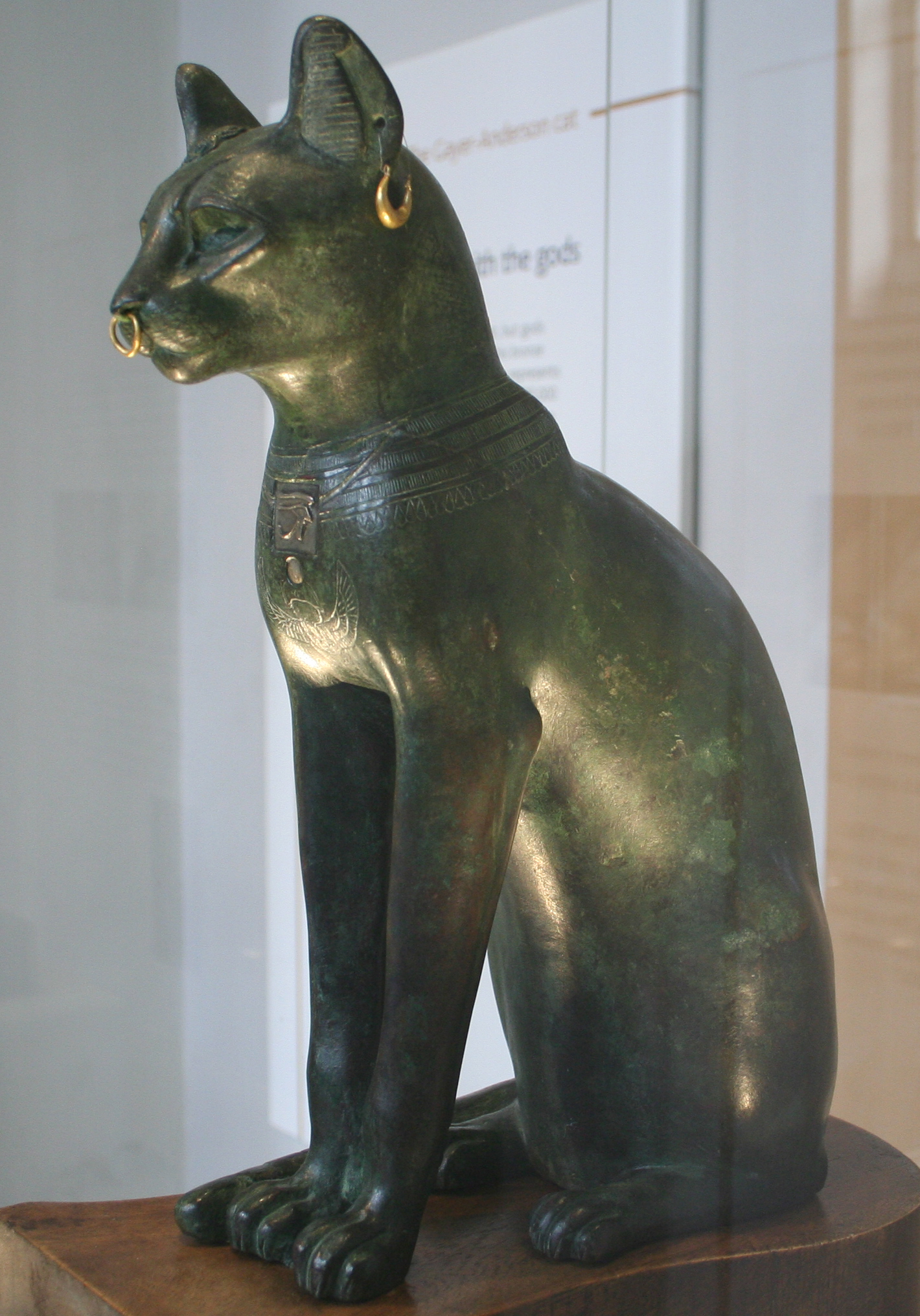
Room 4 – Ancient Egyptian bronze statue of a cat from the Late Period, c. 664–332 BC

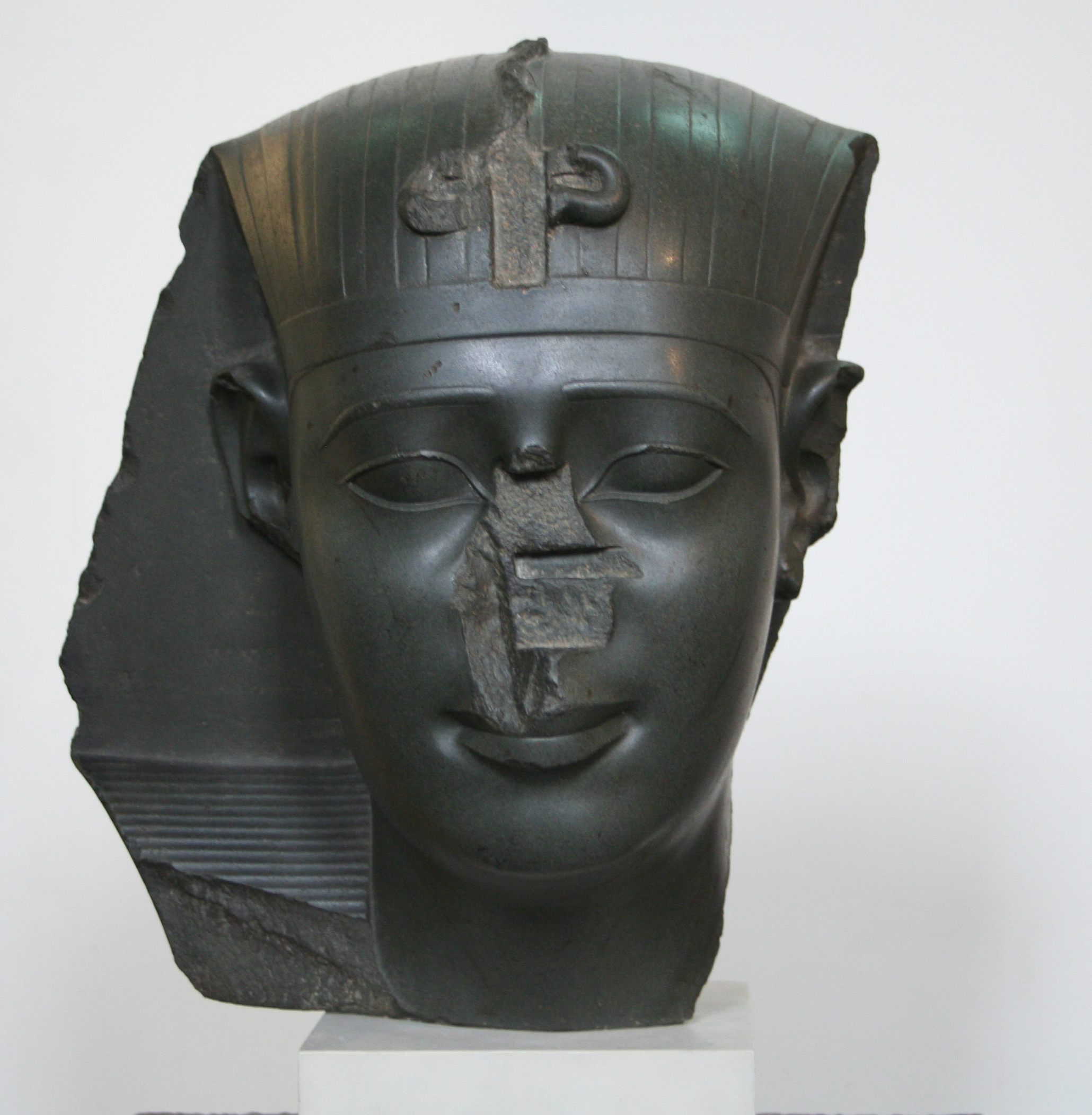
Room 4 – Green siltstone head of a Pharaoh, 26th–30th Dynasty, 600–340 BC

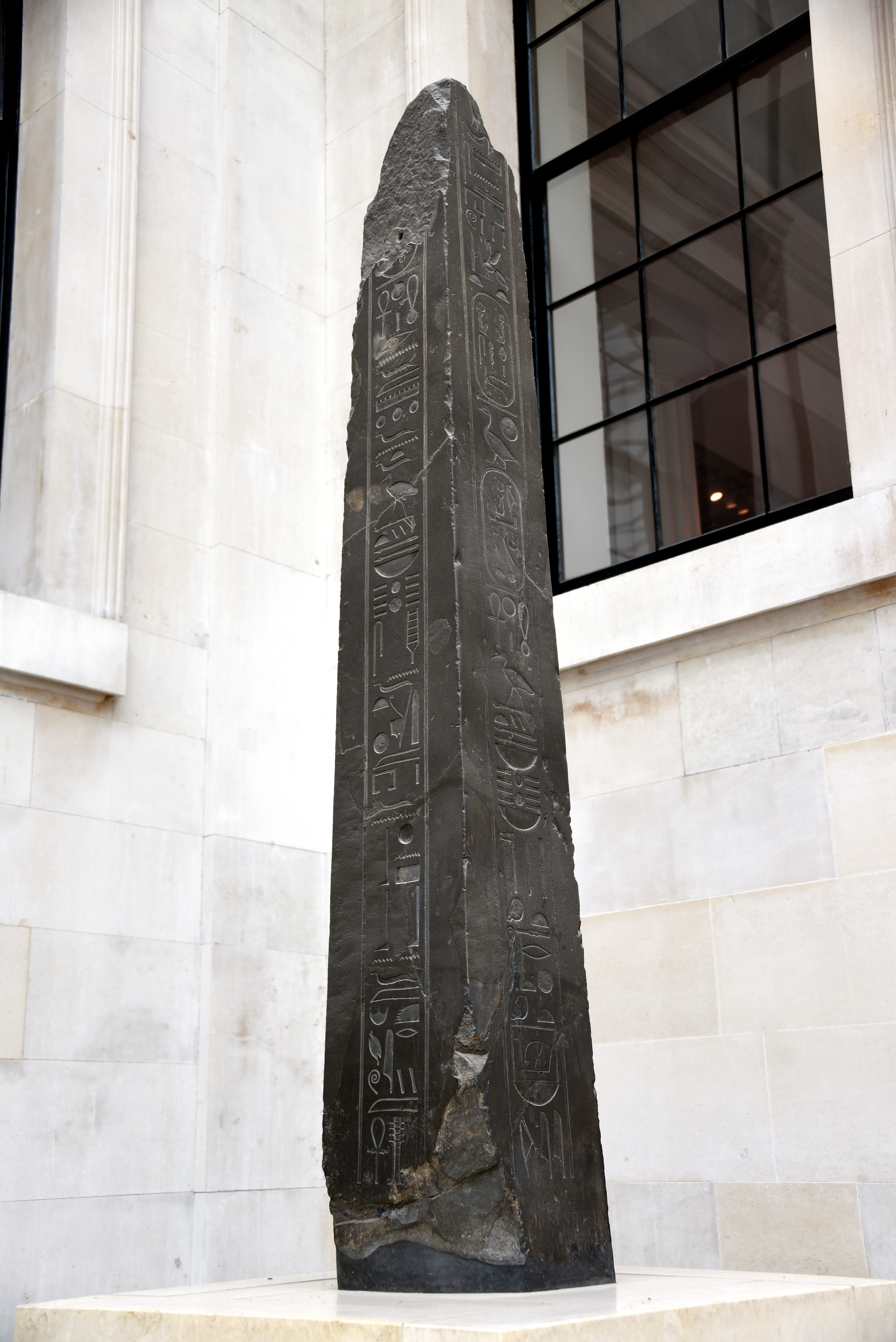
Great Court – Black siltstone obelisk of King Nectanebo II of Egypt, Thirtieth dynasty, c. 350 BC

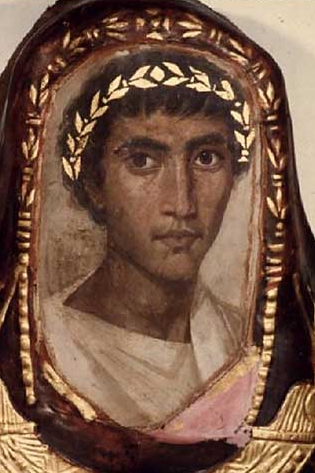
Room 62 – Detail from the mummy case of Artemidorus the Younger, a Greek who had settled in Thebes, Egypt, during Roman times, 100–200 AD

=== Department of Greece and Rome ===
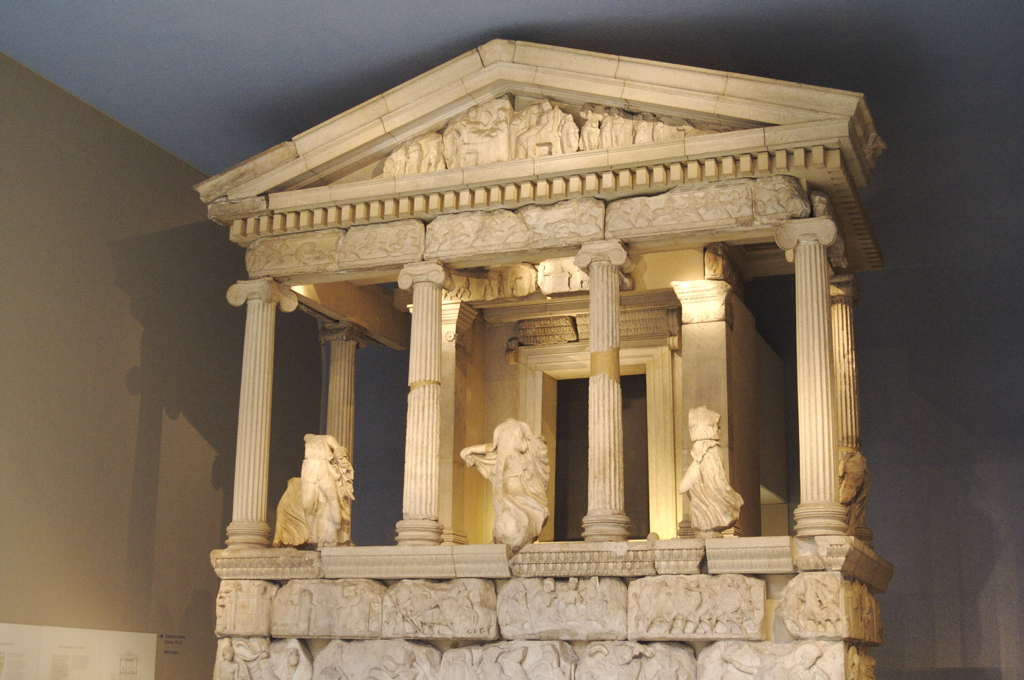
Room 17 – Reconstruction of the Nereid Monument, c. 390 BC

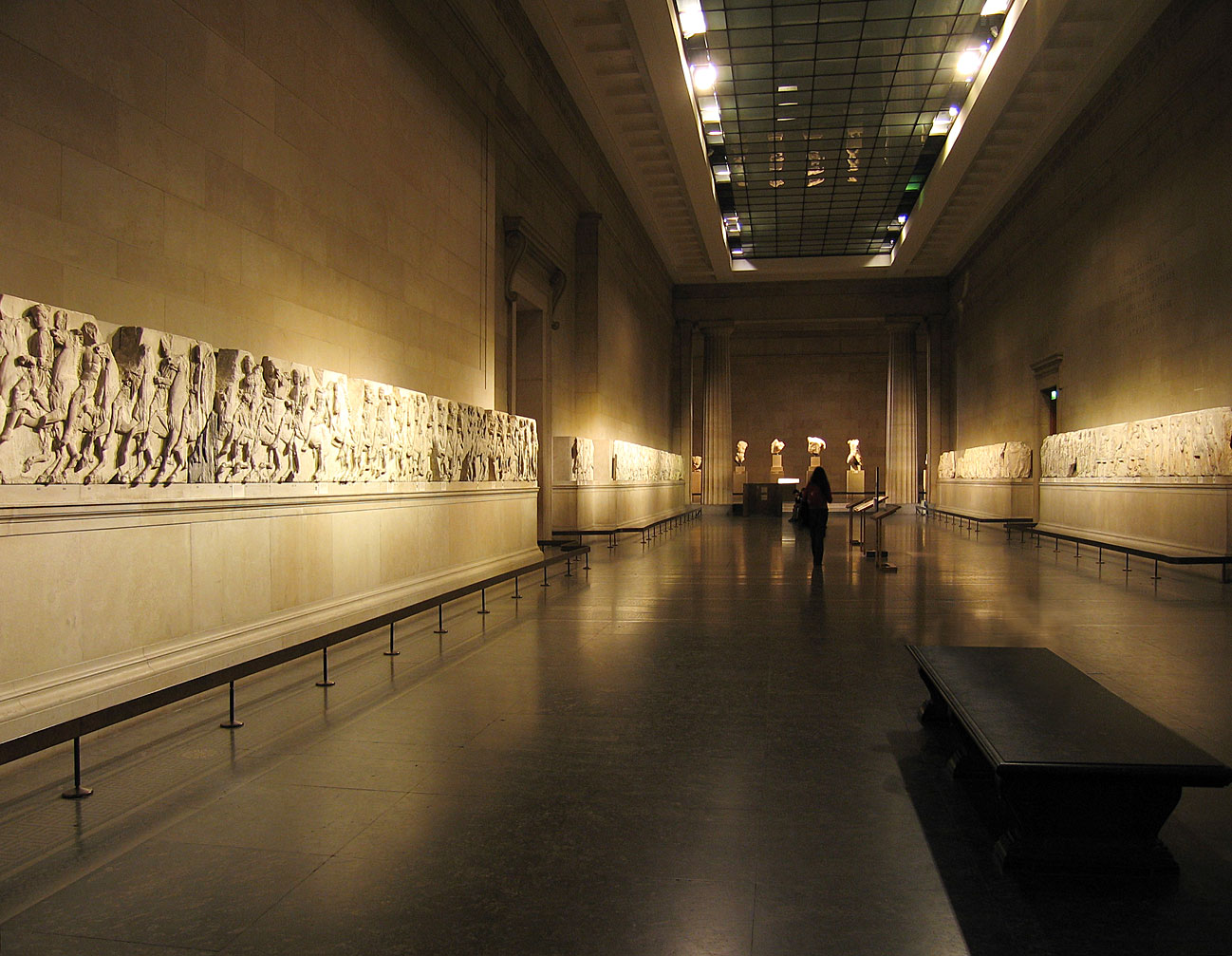
Room 18 – Parthenon marbles from the Acropolis of Athens, 447 BC

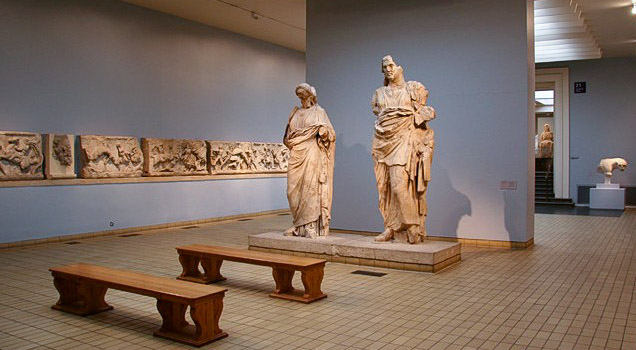
Room 21 – Mausoleum at Halicarnassus, one of the Seven Wonders of the Ancient World, mid-4th century BC

The British Museum has one of the world's largest and most comprehensive collections of antiquities from the Classical world, with over 100,000 objects. These mostly range in date from the beginning of the Greek Bronze Age (about 3200 BC) to the establishment of Christianity as the official religion of the Roman Empire, with the Edict of Milan under the reign of the Roman emperor Constantine I in 313 AD. Archaeology was in its infancy during the nineteenth century and many pioneering individuals began excavating sites across the Classical world, chief among them for the museum were Charles Newton, John Turtle Wood, Robert Murdoch Smith and Charles Fellows.

The Greek objects originate from across the Ancient Greek world, from the mainland of Greece and the Aegean Islands, to neighbouring lands in Asia Minor and Egypt in the eastern Mediterranean and as far as the western lands of Magna Graecia that include Sicily and southern Italy. The Cycladic, Minoan and Mycenaean cultures are represented, and the Greek collection includes important sculpture from the Parthenon in Athens, as well as elements of two of the Seven Wonders of the Ancient World, the Mausoleum at Halicarnassus and the Temple of Artemis at Ephesus.

Beginning from the early Bronze Age, the department also houses one of the widest-ranging collections of Italic and Etruscan antiquities outside Italy, as well as extensive groups of material from Cyprus and non-Greek colonies in Lycia and Caria on Asia Minor. There is some material from the Roman Republic, but the collection's strength is in its comprehensive array of objects from across the Roman Empire, with the exception of Britain (which is the mainstay of the Department of Prehistory and Europe).

The collections of ancient jewellery and bronzes, Greek vases (many from graves in southern Italy that were once part of Sir William Hamilton's and Chevalier Durand's collections), Roman glass including the famous Cameo glass Portland Vase, Roman gold glass (the second largest collection after the Vatican Museums), Roman mosaics from Carthage and Utica in North Africa that were excavated by Nathan Davis, and silver hoards from Roman Gaul (some of which were bequeathed by the philanthropist and museum trustee Richard Payne Knight), are particularly important. Cypriot antiquities are strong too and have benefited from the purchase of Sir Robert Hamilton Lang's collection as well as the bequest of Emma Turner in 1892, which funded many excavations on the island. Roman sculptures (many of which are copies of Greek originals) are particularly well represented by the Townley collection as well as residual sculptures from the famous Farnese collection.

Objects from the Department of Greece and Rome are located throughout the museum, although many of the architectural monuments are to be found on the ground floor, with connecting galleries from Gallery 5 to Gallery 23. On the upper floor, there are galleries devoted to smaller material from ancient Italy, Greece, Cyprus and the Roman Empire.

The current collection includes:

- Temple of Hephaestus
  - Marble coffer frame and coffer from the colonnade, (449–415 BC)
- Parthenon
  - The Parthenon Marbles (Elgin Marbles), (447–438 BC)
- Propylaea
  - Capital and column drum, (437–432 BC)
- Erechtheion
  - A surviving column and architectural fittings, (420–415 BC)
  - One of six remaining Caryatids, (415 BC)
- Temple of Athena Nike
  - Surviving frieze slabs and capital, (427–424 BC)
- Choragic Monument of Thrasyllos
  - Statue of Dionysos, (270 BC)
- Tower of the Winds
  - Marble Corinthian capital, (50 BC)
- Temple of Poseidon, Sounion
  - Fluted column base, (444–440 BC)
- Temple of Nemesis, Rhamnus
  - Head from the statue of Nemesis, (430–420 BC)
- Temple of Bassae
  - Twenty-three surviving blocks of the frieze from the interior of the temple, (420–400 BC)
- Sanctuary of Apollo at Daphni
  - Fluted columns, column bases and ionic capitals (399–301 BC)
- Temple of Athena Polias, Priene
  - Sculptural coffers from the temple ceiling (350–325 BC)
  - Ionic capitals, architraves and antae (350–325 BC)
  - Marble torso of a charioteer (320–300 BC)
- Mausoleum at Halicarnassus
  - Two colossal free-standing figures identified as Maussollos and his wife Artemisia, (c. 350 BC)
  - Part of horse from the chariot group adorning the summit of the Mausoleum, (c. 350 BC)
  - The Amazonomachy frieze – A long section of relief frieze showing the battle between Greeks and Amazons, (c. 350 BC)
- Temple of Artemis in Ephesus
  - One of the sculptured column bases, (340–320 BC)
  - Part of the Ionic frieze situated above the colonnade, (330–300 BC)
- Knidos in Asia Minor
  - Demeter of Knidos, (350 BC)
  - Lion of Knidos, (350–200 BC)
- Xanthos in Asia Minor
  - Lion Tomb, (550–500 BC)
  - Harpy Tomb, (480–470 BC)
  - Nereid Monument, partial reconstruction of a large and elaborate Lykian tomb, (390–380 BC)
  - Tomb of Merehi, (390–350 BC)
  - Tomb of Payava, (375–350 BC)
  - Bilingual Decree of Pixodaros, (340 BC)
- Temple of Zeus, Salamis in Cyprus
  - Marble capital with caryatid figure standing between winged bulls, (300–250 BC)

Wider collection

Prehistoric Greece and Italy (3300 BC – 8th century BC)

- Over thirty Cycladic figures from islands in the Aegean Sea, many collected by James Theodore Bent, Greece (3300–2000 BC)
- A large Gaudo culture askos from Paestum, southern Italy (2800–2400 BC)
- Kythnos Hoard of wood working metal tools from the island of Naxos, Greece (2700–2200 BC)
- Two pottery kernos from Phylakopi in Melos, Greece (2300–2000 BC)
- Material from the Palace of Knossos including a huge pottery storage jar, some donated by Sir Arthur Evans, Crete, Greece (1900–1100 BC)
- The Minoan gold treasure from Aegina, northern Aegean, Greece (1850–1550 BC)
- Artefacts from the Psychro Cave in Crete, including two serpentine libation tables (1700–1450 BC)
- Bronze Minoan Bull-leaper from Rethymnon, Crete (1600–1450 BC)
- Segments of the columns and architraves from the Treasury of Atreus, Peloponnese, Greece (1350–1250 BC)
- Ivory game board found at Enkomi, Cyprus (12th century BC)
- Nuragic hoard of bronze artefacts found at Santa Maria in Paulis, Cagliari, Sardinia (1100–900 BC)
- Elgin Amphora, highly decorated pottery vase attributed to the Dipylon Master, Athens, Greece (8th century BC)
- Votive offerings from the Sanctuary of Artemis Orthia at Sparta (8th century BC)

Etruscan (8th century BC – 1st century BC)

- Gold jewellery and other rich artefacts from the Castellani and Galeassi Tombs in Palestrina, central Italy (8th–6th centuries BC)
- Ornate gold fibula with granulated parade of animals from the Bernardini Tomb, Cerveteri (675–650 BC)
- Various objects including two small terracotta statues from the "Tomb of the five chairs" in Cerveteri (625–600 BC)
- Gold libation bowl from Sant'Angelo Muxaro, Sicily (600 BC)
- Contents of the Isis tomb and François Tomb, Vulci (570–560 BC)
- Painted terracotta plaques (the so-called Boccanera Plaques) from a tomb in Cerveteri (560–550 BC)
- Decorated silver panels from Castel San Marino, near Perugia (540–520 BC)
- Statuette of a Bronze votive figure from Pizzidimonte, near Prato, Italy (500–480 BC)
- Bronze helmet with inscription commemorating the Battle of Cumae, Olympia, Greece (480 BC)
- Bronze votive statuettes from the Lake of the Idols, Monte Falterona (420–400 BC)
- Part of a symposium set of bronze vessels from the tomb of Larth Metie, Bolsena, Italy (400–300 BC)
- Exquisite gold ear-ring with female head pendant, one of a pair from Perugia (300–200 BC)
- Oscan Tablet, one of the most important inscriptions in the Oscan language (300–100 BC)
- Hoard of gold jewellery from Sant'Eufemia Lamezia, southern Italy (340–330 BC)
- Latian bronze figure from the Sanctuary of Diana, Lake Nemi, Latium (200–100 BC)
- Sarcophagus of Seianti Hanunia Tlesnasa from Chiusi (150–140 BC)

Ancient Greece (8th century BC – 4th century AD)

- Orientalising gold jewellery from the Camirus cemetery in Rhodes (700–600 BC)
- Foot from the colossal Kouros of Apollo, Delos (600–500 BC)
- Group of life-size archaic statues from the Sacred Way at Didyma, western Turkey (600–580 BC)
- Bronze statuette of a rider and horse from Armento, southern Italy (550 BC)
- Bronze head of an axe from San Sosti, southern Italy (520 BC)
- Statue of a nude standing youth from Marion, Cyprus (520–510 BC)
- Large terracotta sarcophagus and lid with painted scenes from Klazomenai, western Turkey (510–480 BC)
- Two bronze tablets in the Locrian Greek dialect from Galaxidi, central Greece (500–475 BC)
- Bronze mitra inscribed on both sides in archaic Cretan script with the Spensithios Decree, Lyttos-Afrati region in Crete (c. 500 BC)
- Fragments from a large bronze equestrian statue of the Taranto Rider, southern Italy (480–460 BC)
- Chatsworth Apollo Head, Tamassos, Cyprus (460 BC)
- Statue of recumbent bull from the Dipylon Cemetery, Athens (4th century BC)
- Hoard of gold jewellery from Avola, Sicily (370–300 BC)
- Dedicatory inscription by Alexander the Great from Priene in Turkey (330 BC)
- Head from the colossal statue of the Asclepius of Milos, Greece (325–300 BC)
- Braganza Brooch, Ornamental gold fibula reflecting Celtic and Greek influences (3rd century BC)
- Hoard of silver patera from Èze, southeastern France (3rd century BC)
- Gold tablet from an Orphic sanctuary in southern Italy (3rd–2nd centuries BC)
- Marble relief of the Apotheosis of Homer from Bovillae, central Italy (221–205 BC)
- Bronze sculpture of a Greek poet known as the Arundel Head, western Turkey (2nd–1st centuries BC)
- Remains of the Scylla monument at Bargylia, south west Anatolia, Turkey (200–150 BC)
- Bronze head and hand of the statue of Aphrodite of Satala (1st century BC)
- Bronze statuettes from Paramythia (2nd century AD)
- Large statue of Europa sitting on the back of a bull from the amphitheatre at Gortyna, Crete (100 BC)

Ancient Rome (1st century BC – 4th century AD)

- Pair of engraved oval agate plaques depicting Livia as Diana and Octavian as Mercury (Rome, 30–25 BC)
- Guildford Puteal from Corinth, Greece (30–10 BC)
- Bronze head of Augustus from Meroë in Sudan (27–25 BC)
- Cameo glass Portland Vase, the most famous glass vessel from ancient Rome (1–25 AD)
- Silver Warren Cup with homoerotic scenes, found near Jerusalem (5–15 AD)
- Gladius of Mainz (or "Sword of Tiberius") and Blacas Cameo, depicting Roman emperors in triumph (15 AD)
- Horse trappings in decorated silver-plated bronze from Xanten, Germany (1st century AD)
- Pair of carved fluorite cups known as the Barber Cup and Crawford Cup (100 AD)
- Athlete statue, "Vaison Diadumenos", from an ancient Roman city in southern France (118–138 AD)
- A hoard of silver votive plaques dedicated to the Roman God Jupiter Dolichenus, discovered in Heddernheim, near Frankfurt, Germany (1st–2nd centuries AD)
- Discus-thrower (Discobolos) and Bronze Head of Hypnos from Civitella d'Arna, Italy (1st–2nd centuries AD)
- Part of a large wooden wheel for draining a copper mine in Huelva, southern Spain (1st–2nd centuries AD)
- Capitals from some of the pilasters of the Pantheon, Rome (126 AD)
- Colossal marble head of Faustina the Elder, wife of the Roman emperor Antoninus Pius from Sardis, western Turkey (140 AD)
- Marble throne from the prohedria of the Panathenaic Stadium, Athens (140–143 AD)
- Hoard of jewellery from a tomb in the vicinity of Miletopolis, Turkey (175–180 AD)
- Inscribed marble base of the Roman Consul Tiberius Claudius Candidus, unearthed in Tarragona, Spain (195–199 AD)
- Jennings Dog, a statue of a Molossian guard dog, central Italy (2nd century AD)
- Segment of a decorated marble balustrade from the Colosseum, Rome, Italy (2nd century AD)
- Politarch inscription from the Vardar Gate, Thessaloniki, Greece (2nd century AD)
- Two Roman cavalry bronze parade masks from Nola, Italy and Gaziantep, Turkey, (2nd century AD)
- Bronze tablet dedicated to Sextus Pompeius Maximus from the Mithraeum at Ostia, Italy (200 AD)
- Various silver treasures found at Arcisate, Beaurains, Boscoreale, Bursa, Chaourse, Caubiac, Chatuzange, Conimbriga, Mâcon and Revel-Tourdan (1st–3rd century AD)
- Votive statue of Apollo of Cyrene, Libya (2nd century AD)
- Uerdingen Hoard found near Düsseldorf in Germany (2nd–3rd centuries AD)

The collection encompasses architectural, sculptural and epigraphic items from many other sites across the classical world including Amathus, Atripalda, Aphrodisias, Delos, Iasos, Idalion, Lindus, Kalymnos, Kerch, Rhamnous, Salamis, Sestos, Sounion, Tomis and Thessaloniki.

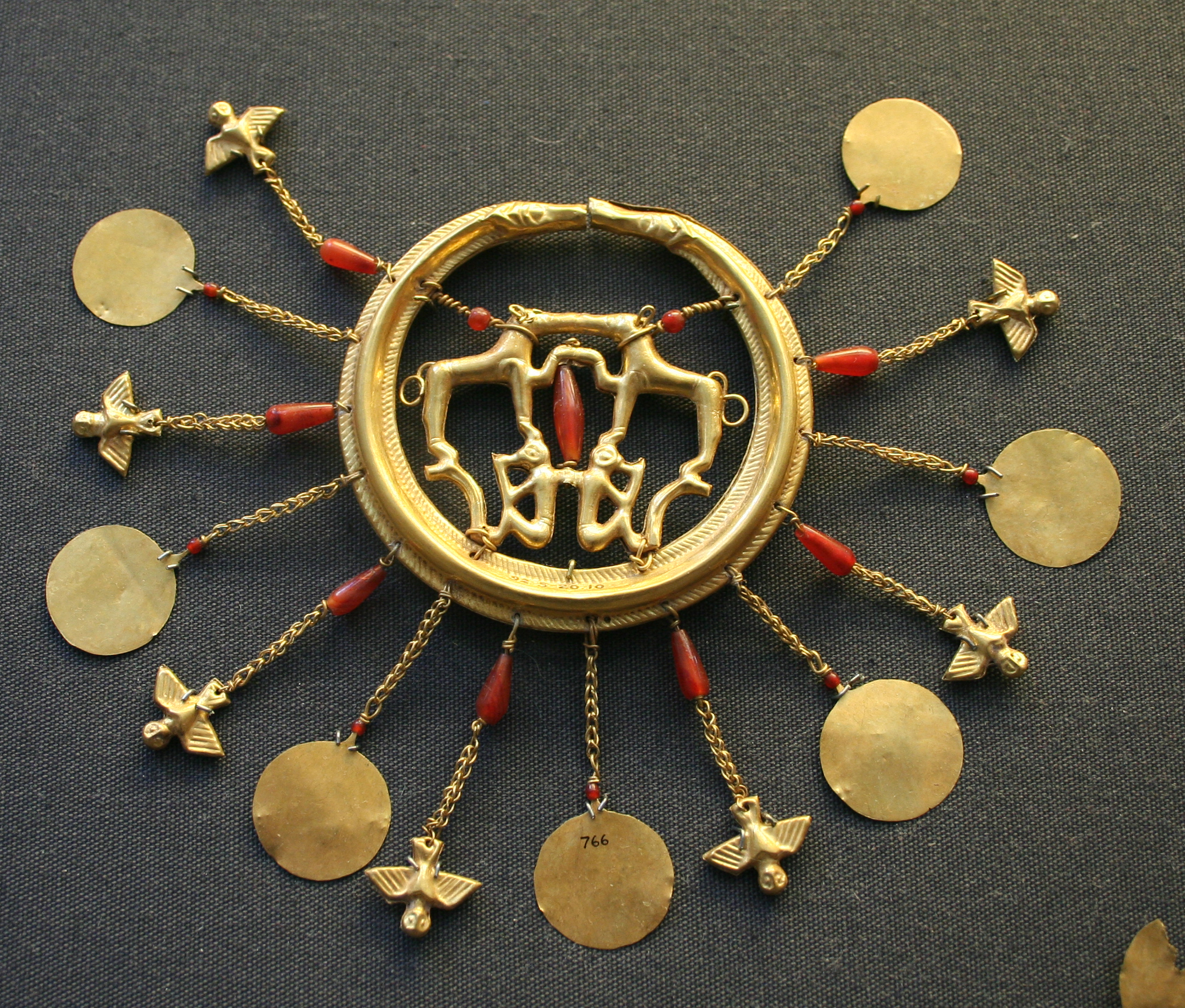
Room 12 – A gold earring from the Aegina Treasure, Greece, 1700–1500 BC

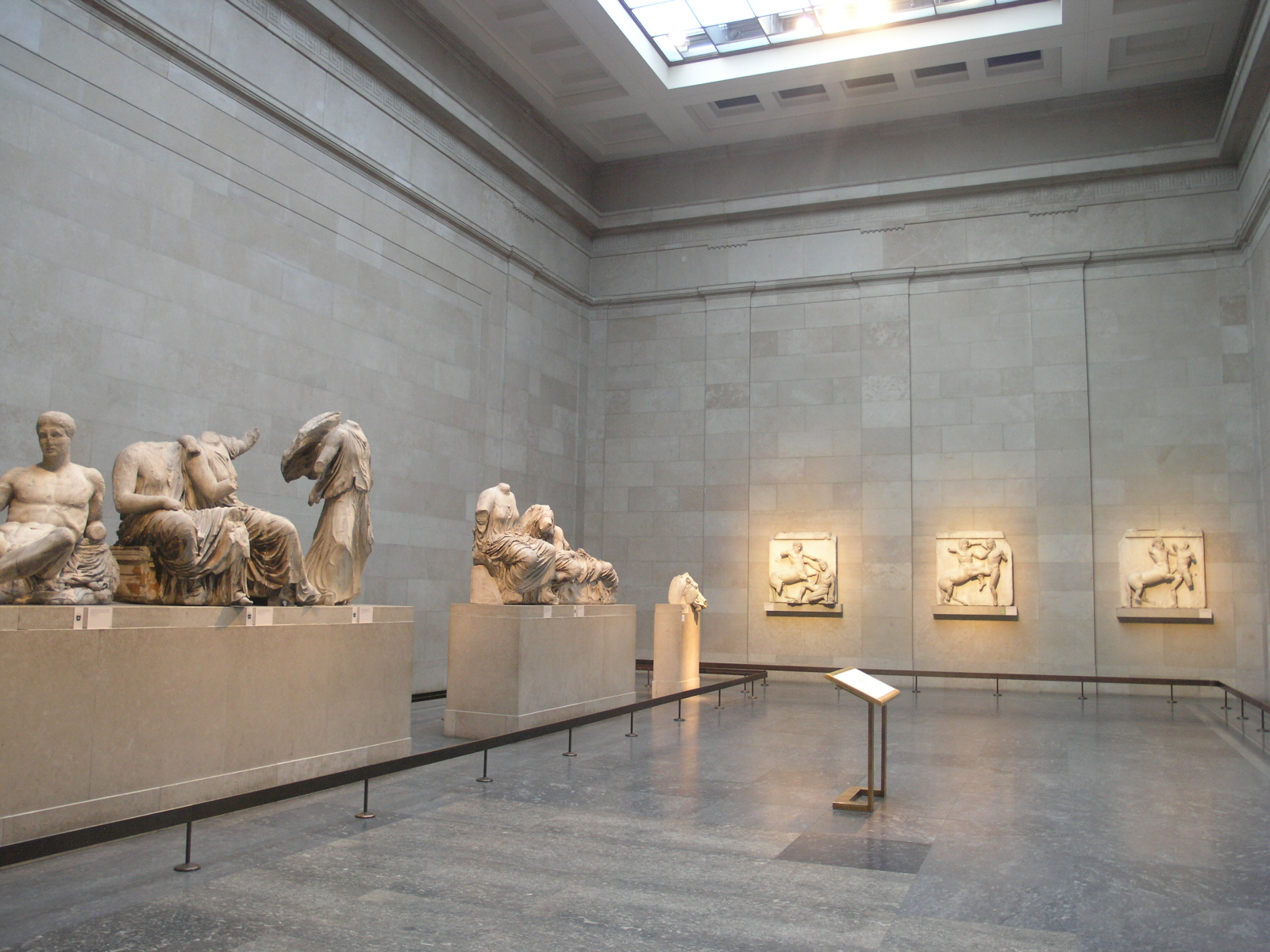
Room 18 – Parthenon statuary from the east pediment and Metopes from the south wall, Athens, Greece, 447–438 BC

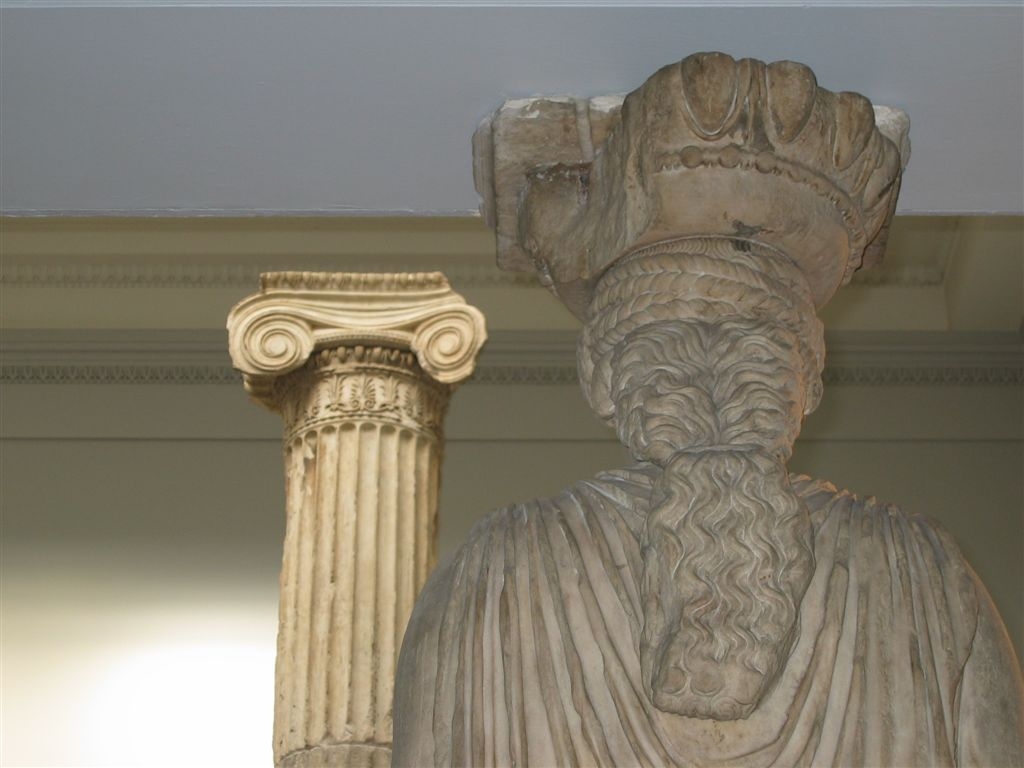
Room 19 – Caryatid and Ionian column from the Erechtheion, Acropolis of Athens, Greece, 420–415 BC

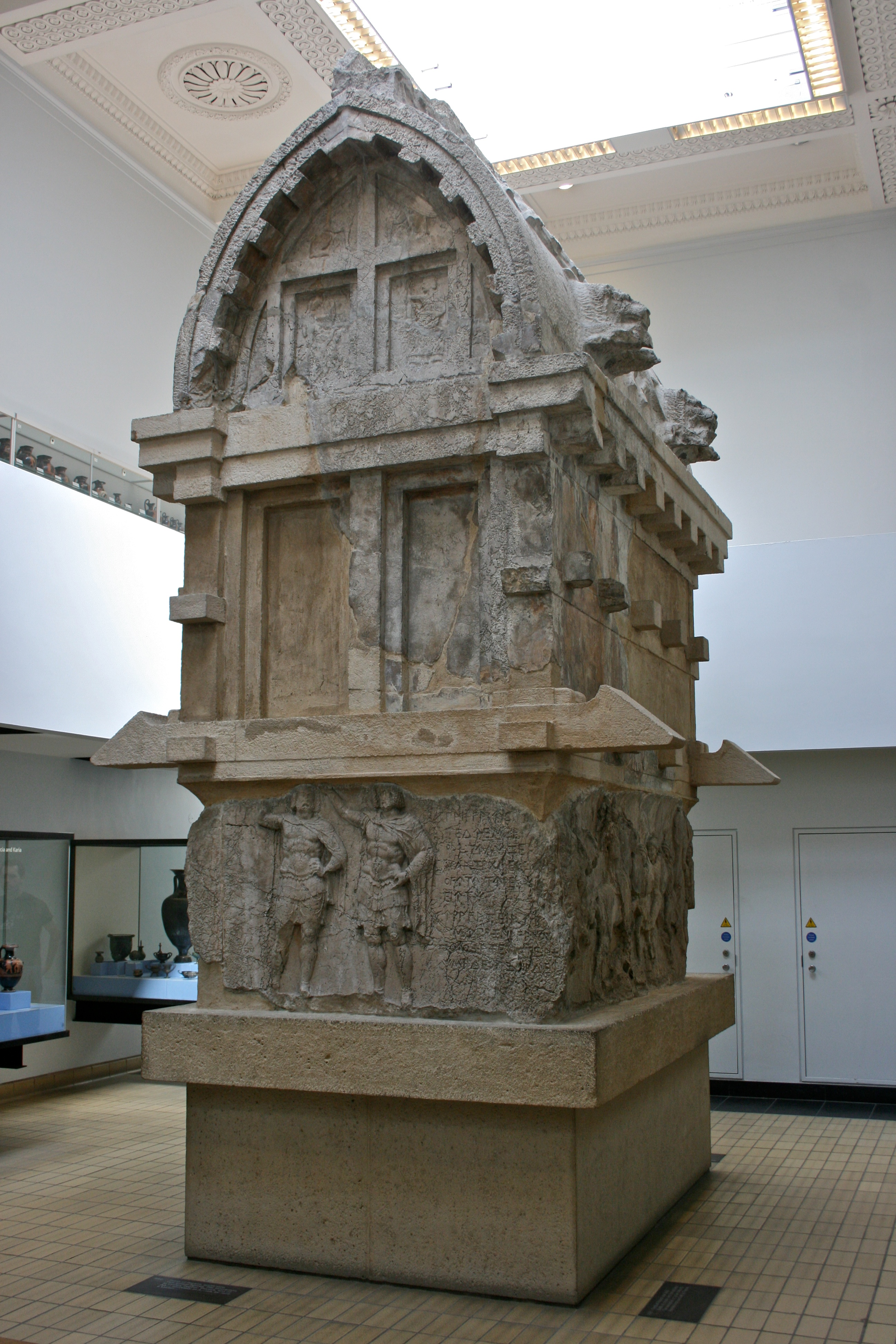
Room 20 – Tomb of Payava, Lycia, Turkey, 360 BC

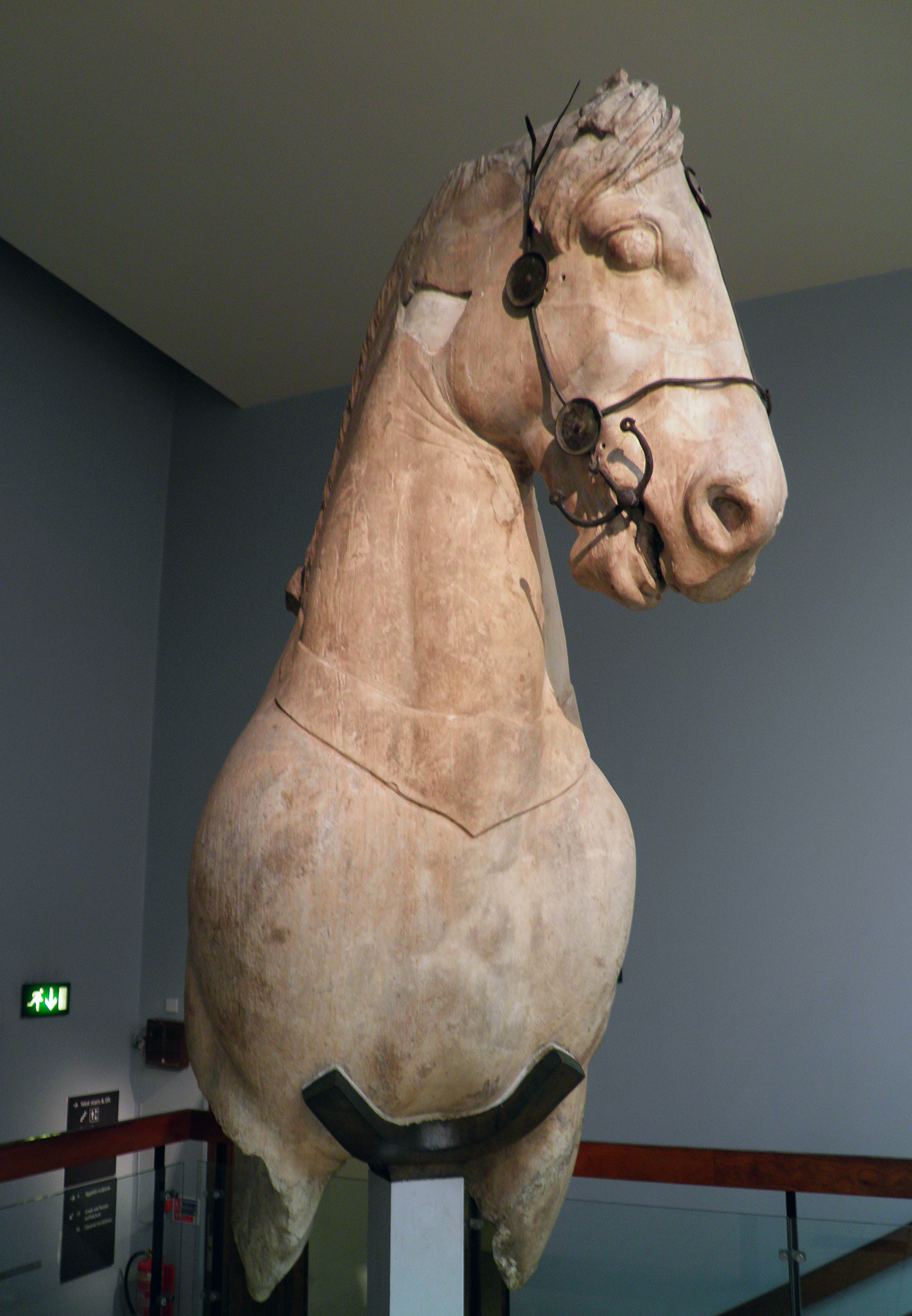
Room 21 – Fragmentary horse from the colossal chariot group which topped the podium of the Mausoleum at Halicarnassus, one of the Seven Wonders of the Ancient World, Turkey, c. 350 BC

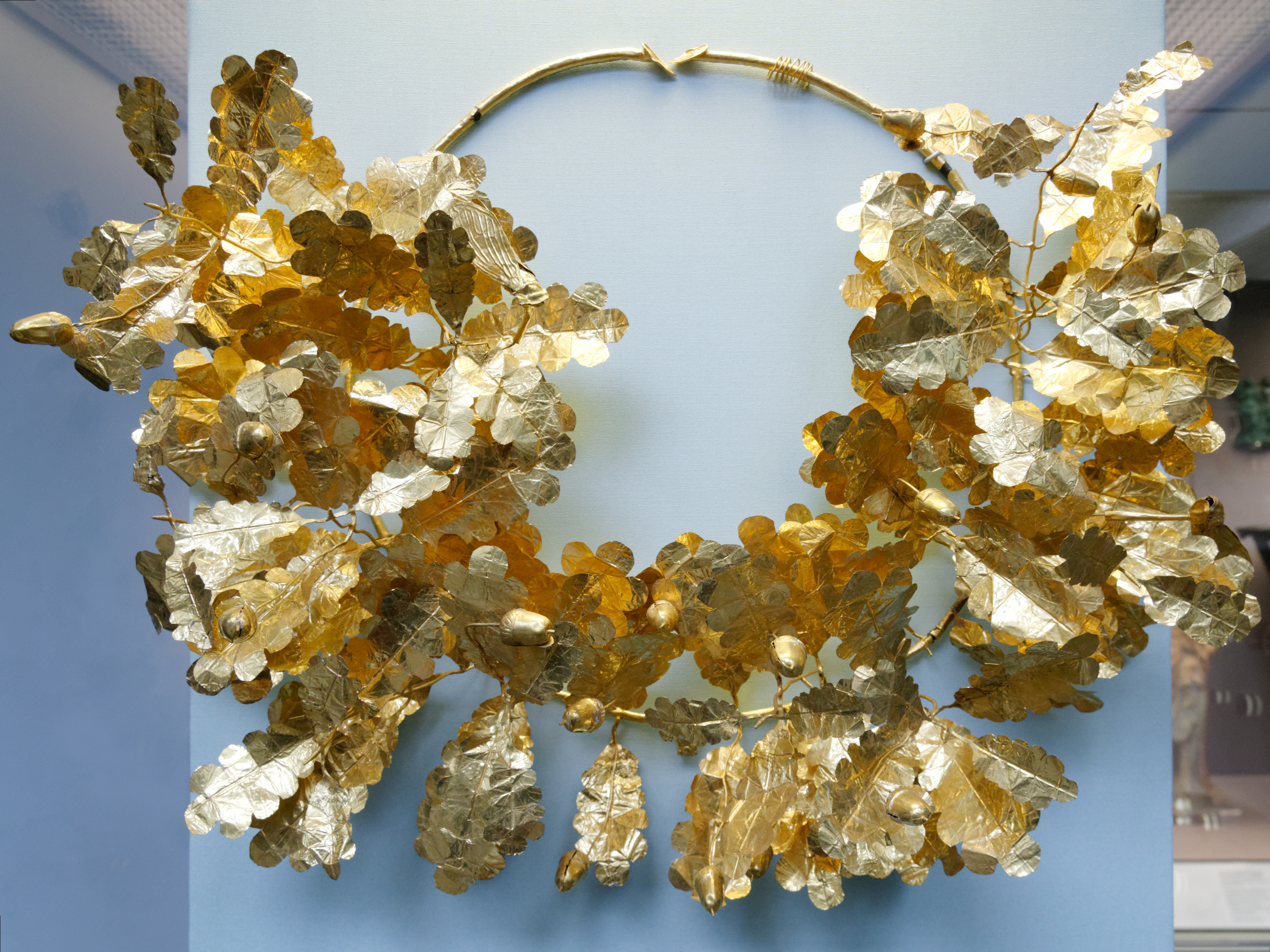
Room 22 – Gold oak wreath with a bee and two cicadas, western Turkey, c. 350–300 BC

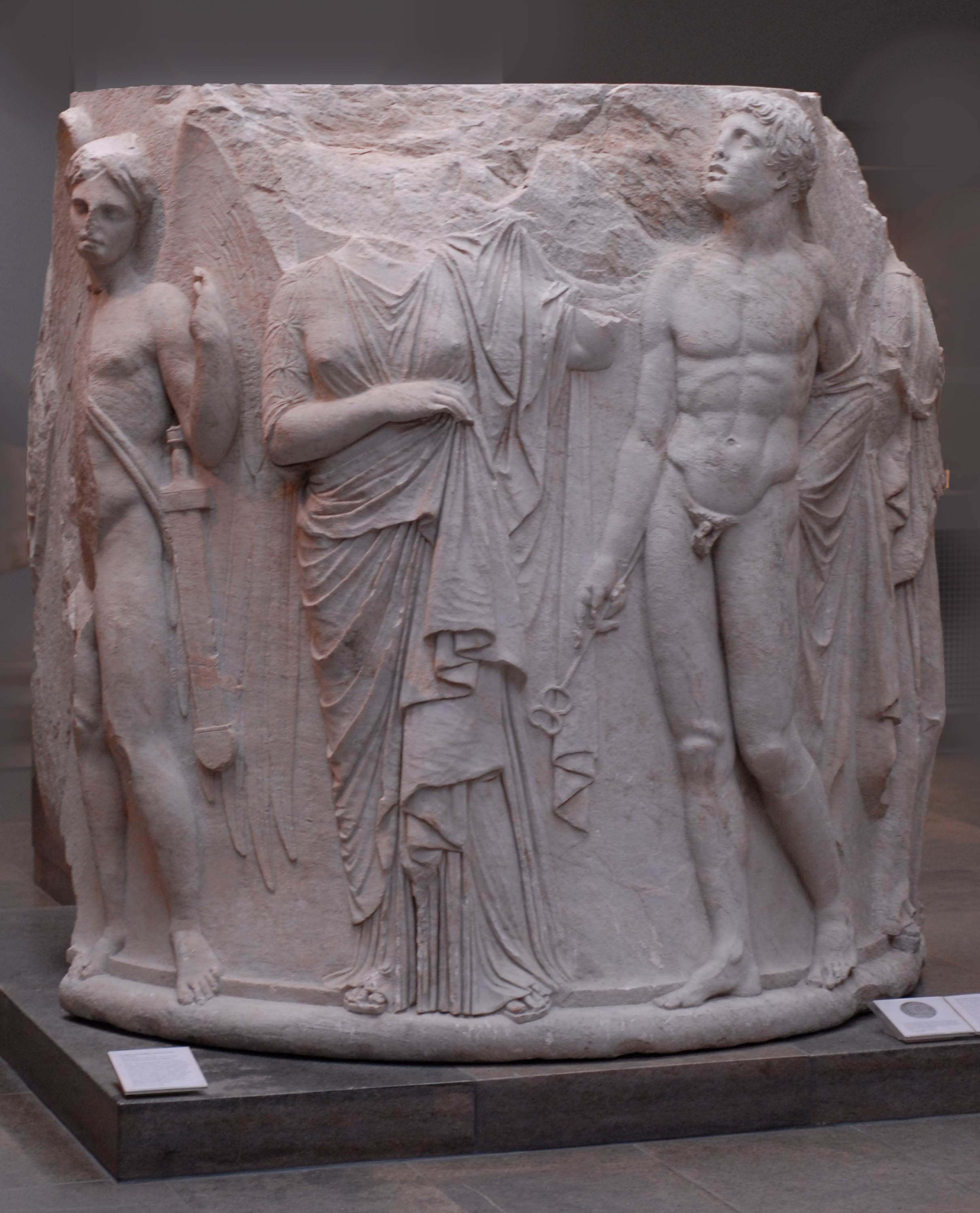
Room 22 – Column from the Temple of Artemis in Ephesus, one of the Seven Wonders of the Ancient World, Turkey, early 4th century BC

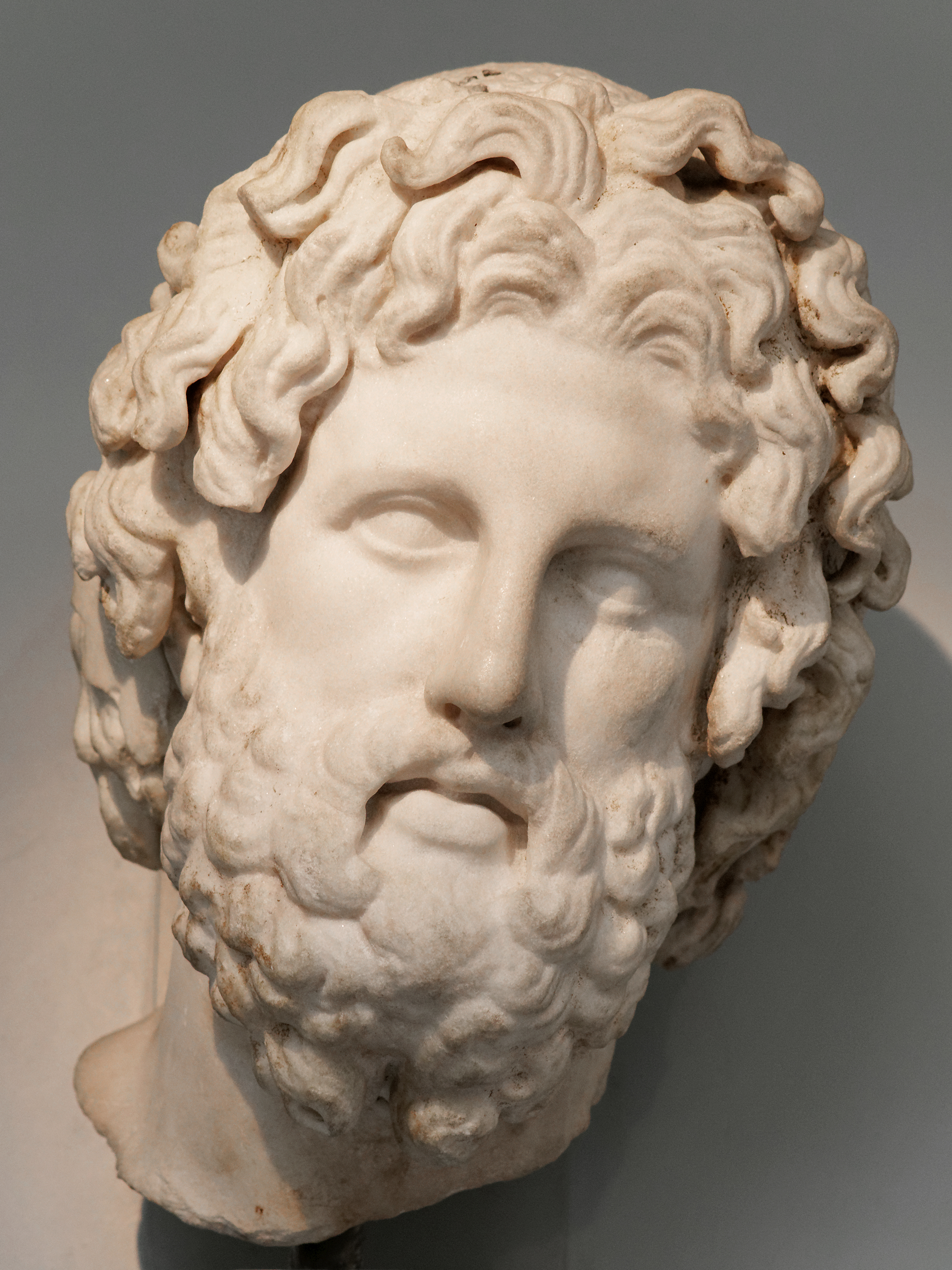
Room 22 – Colossal head of Asclepius wearing a metal crown (now lost), from a cult statue on Melos, Greece, 325–300 BC

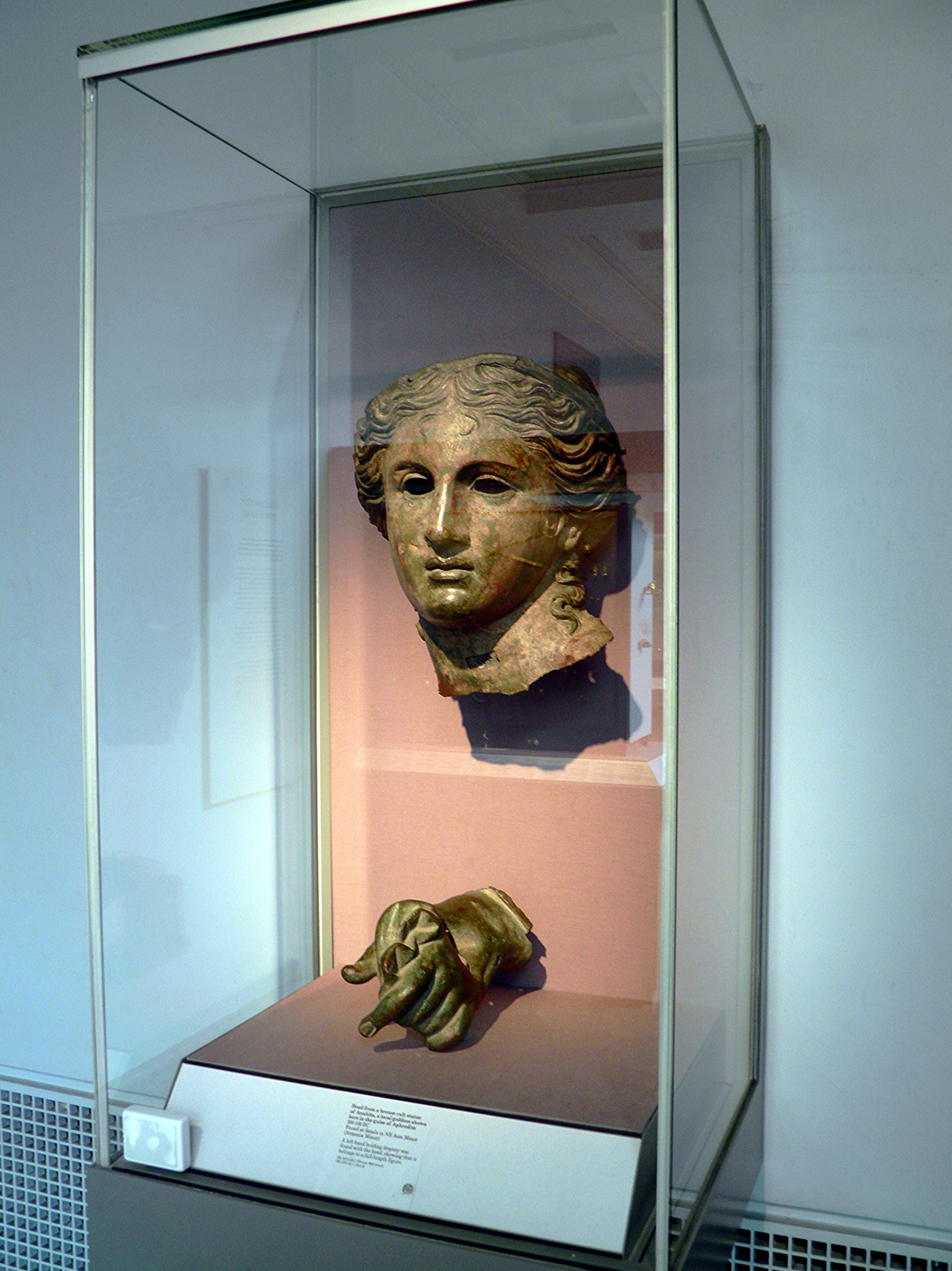
Room 22 – Bronze head and hand of an ancient Hellenistic statue discovered in Satala, Turkey, 200–100 BC

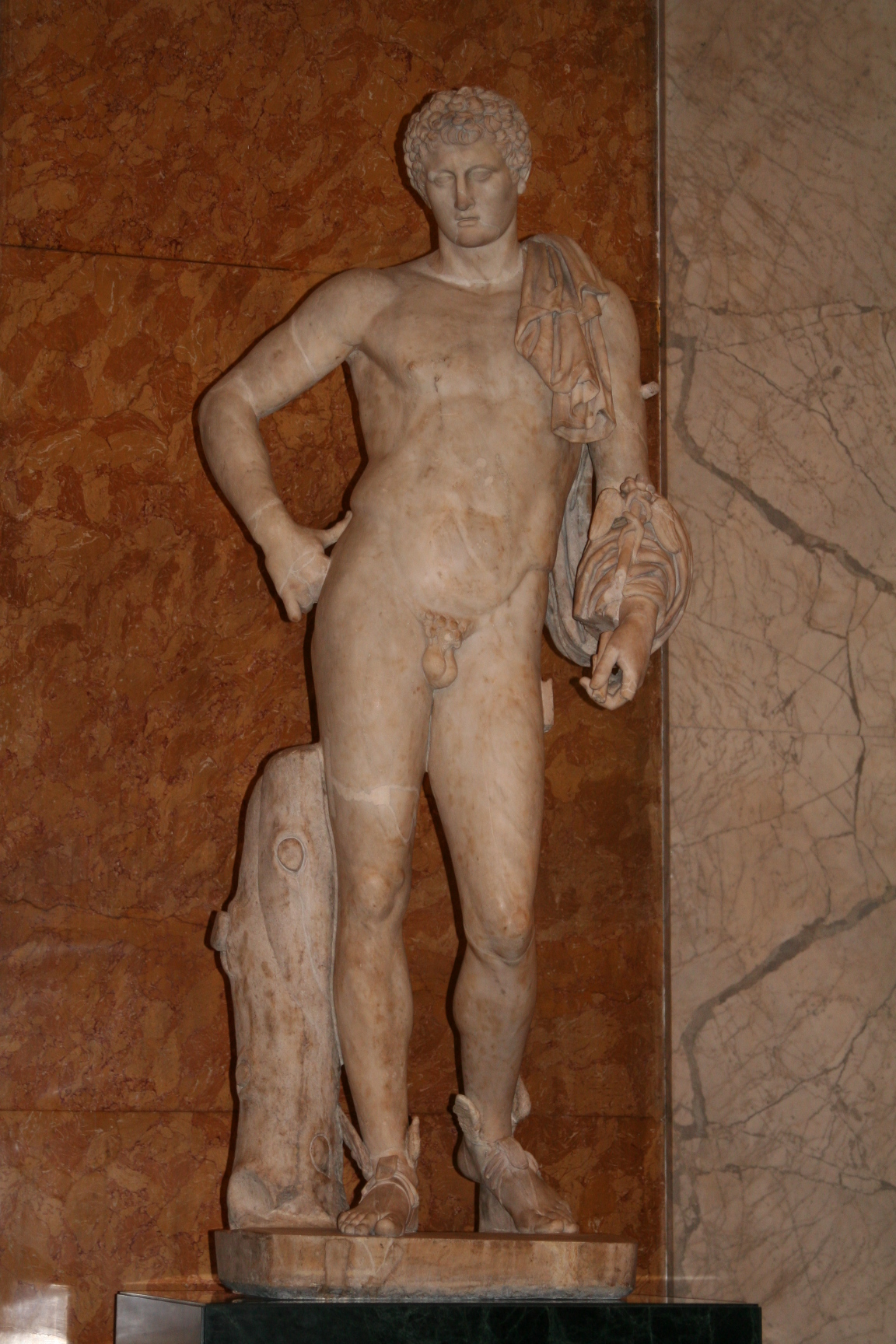
Room 1 – Farnese Hermes in the Enlightenment Gallery, Italy, 1st century AD

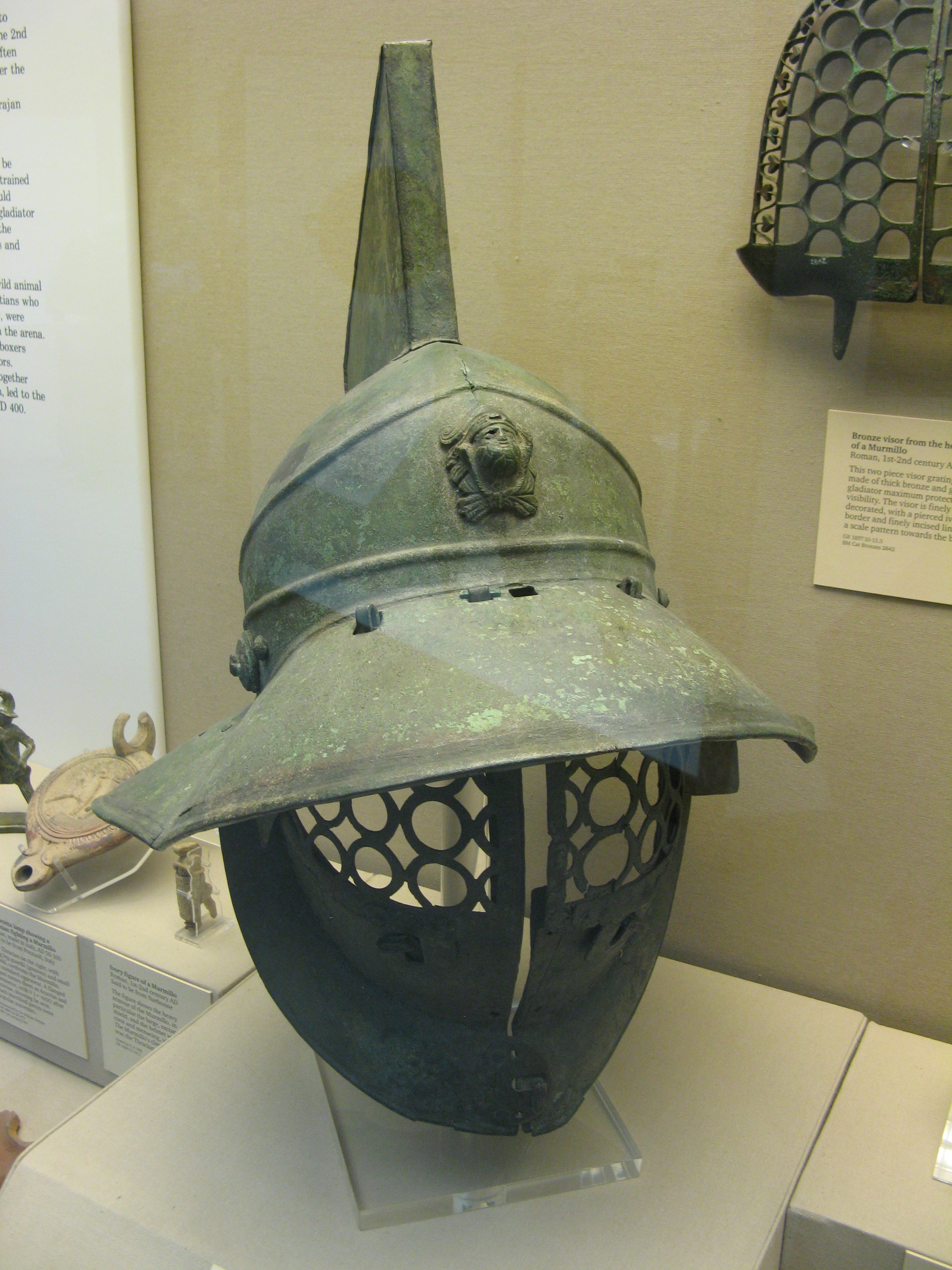
Room 69 – Roman gladiator helmet from Pompeii, Italy, 1st century AD

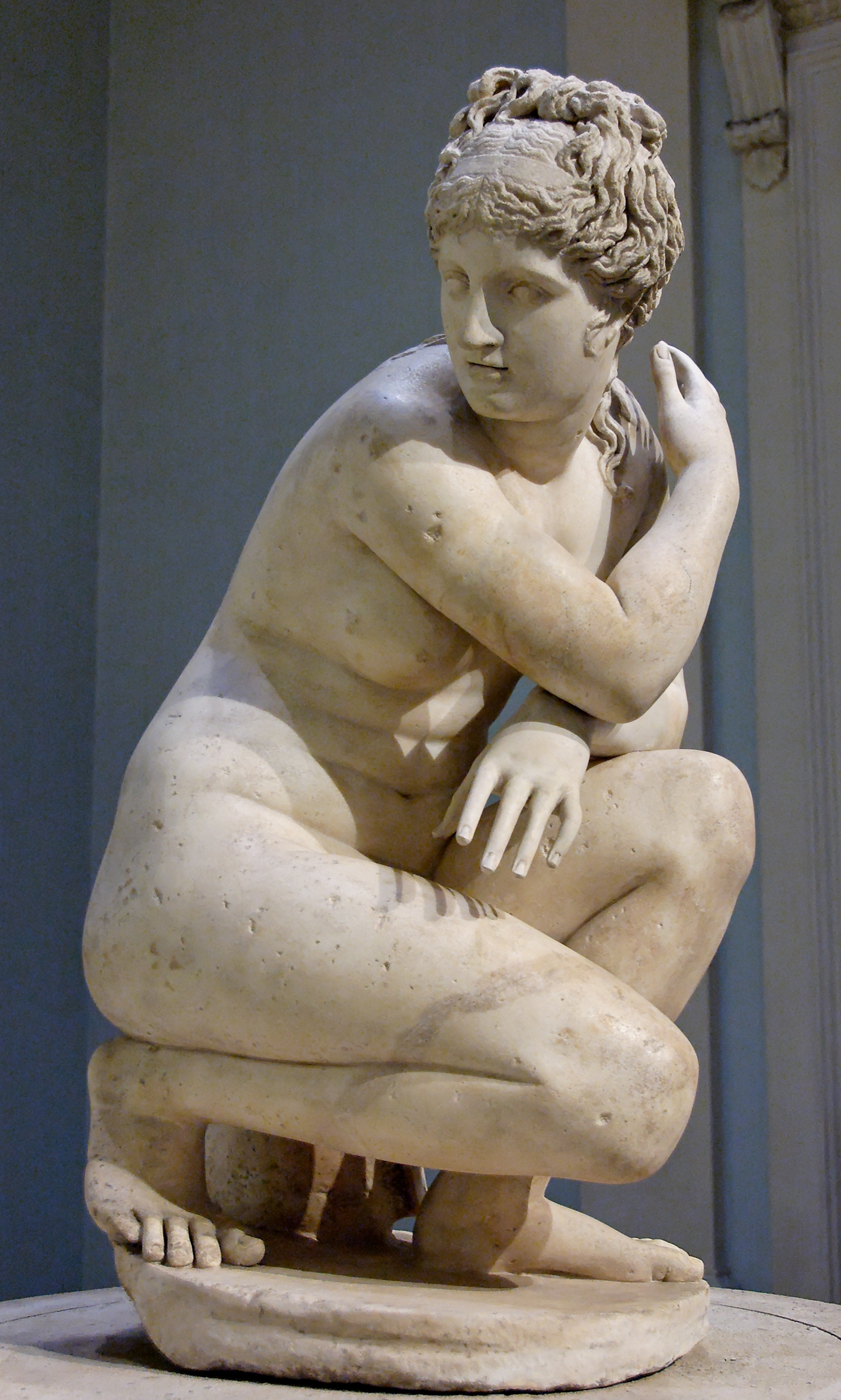
Room 23 – The famous version of the 'Crouching Venus', Roman, c. 1st century AD

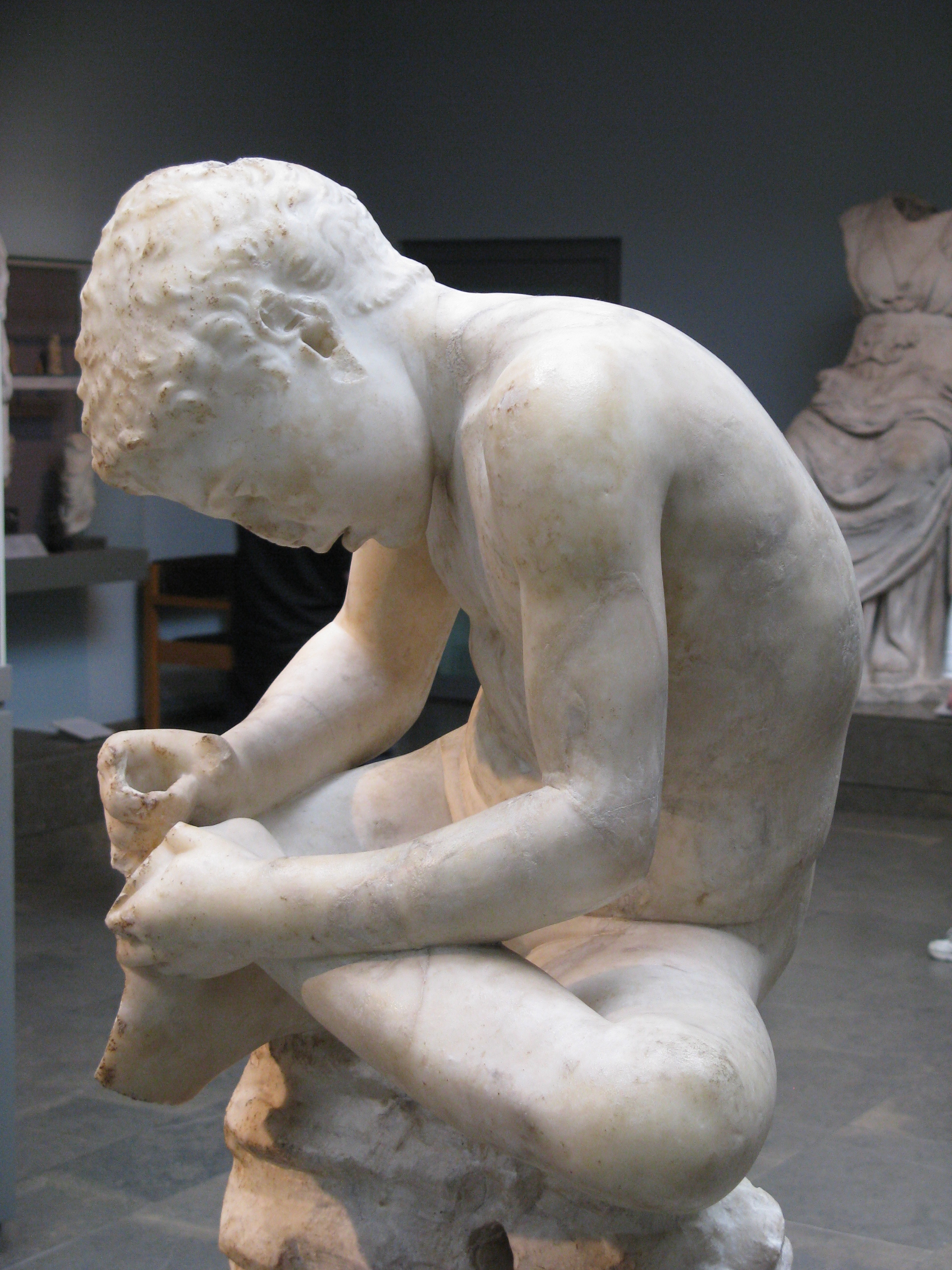
Room 22 – Roman marble copy of the famous 'Spinario (Boy with Thorn)', Italy, c. 1st century AD

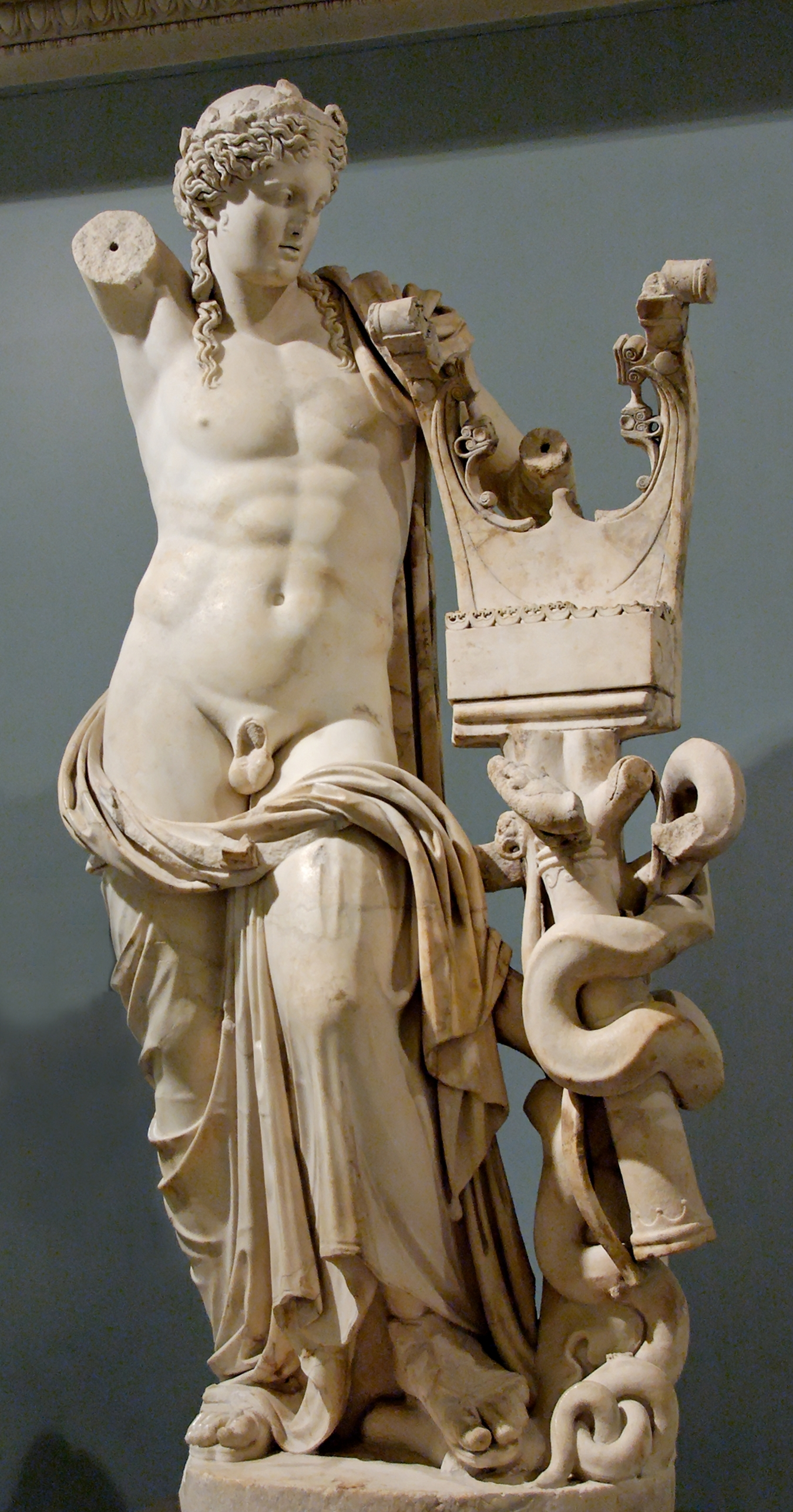
Room 22 – Apollo of Cyrene (holding a lyre), Libya, c. 2nd century AD

=== Department of the Middle East ===
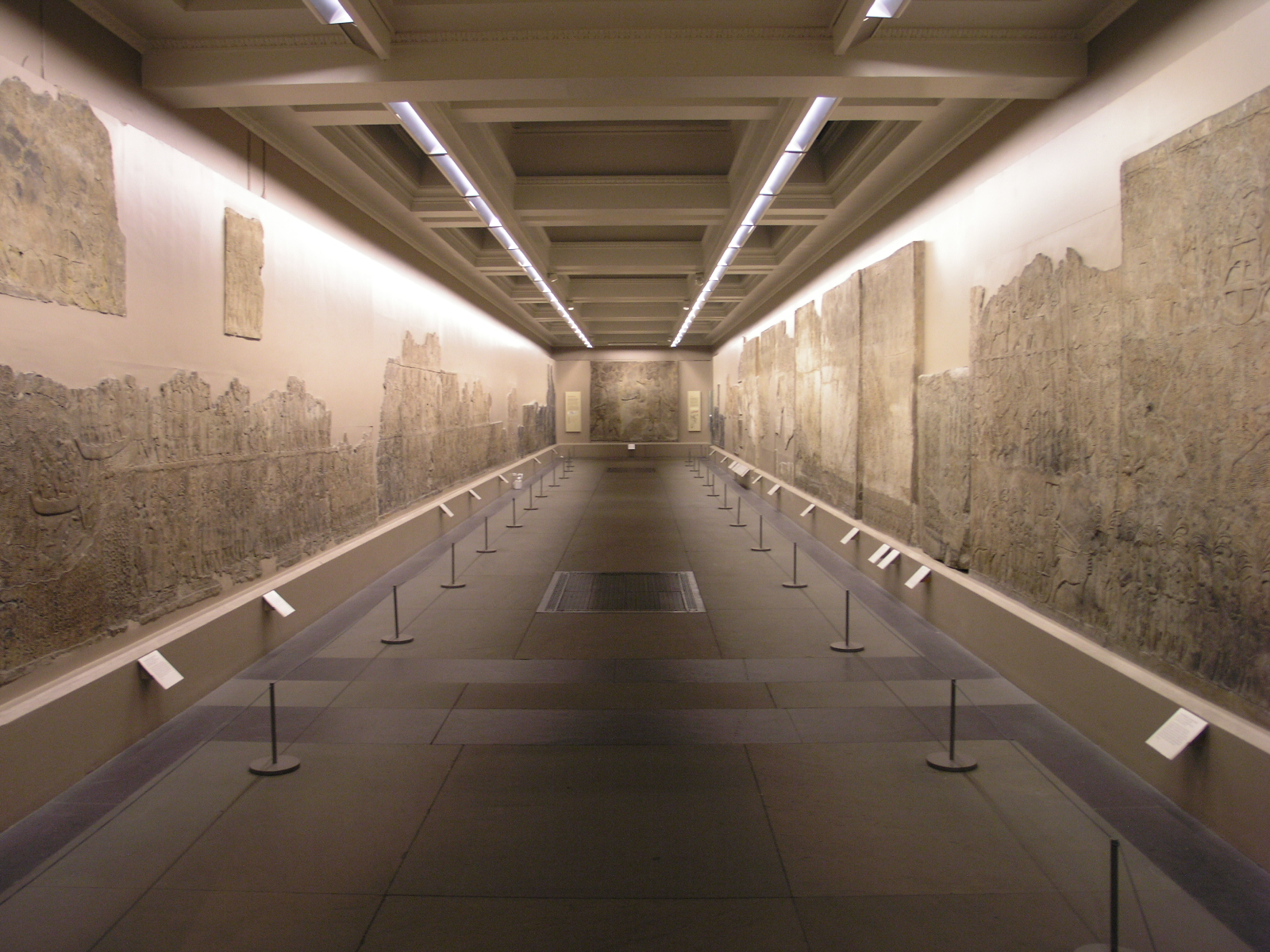
Room 9 – Assyrian palace reliefs, Nineveh, 701–681 BC

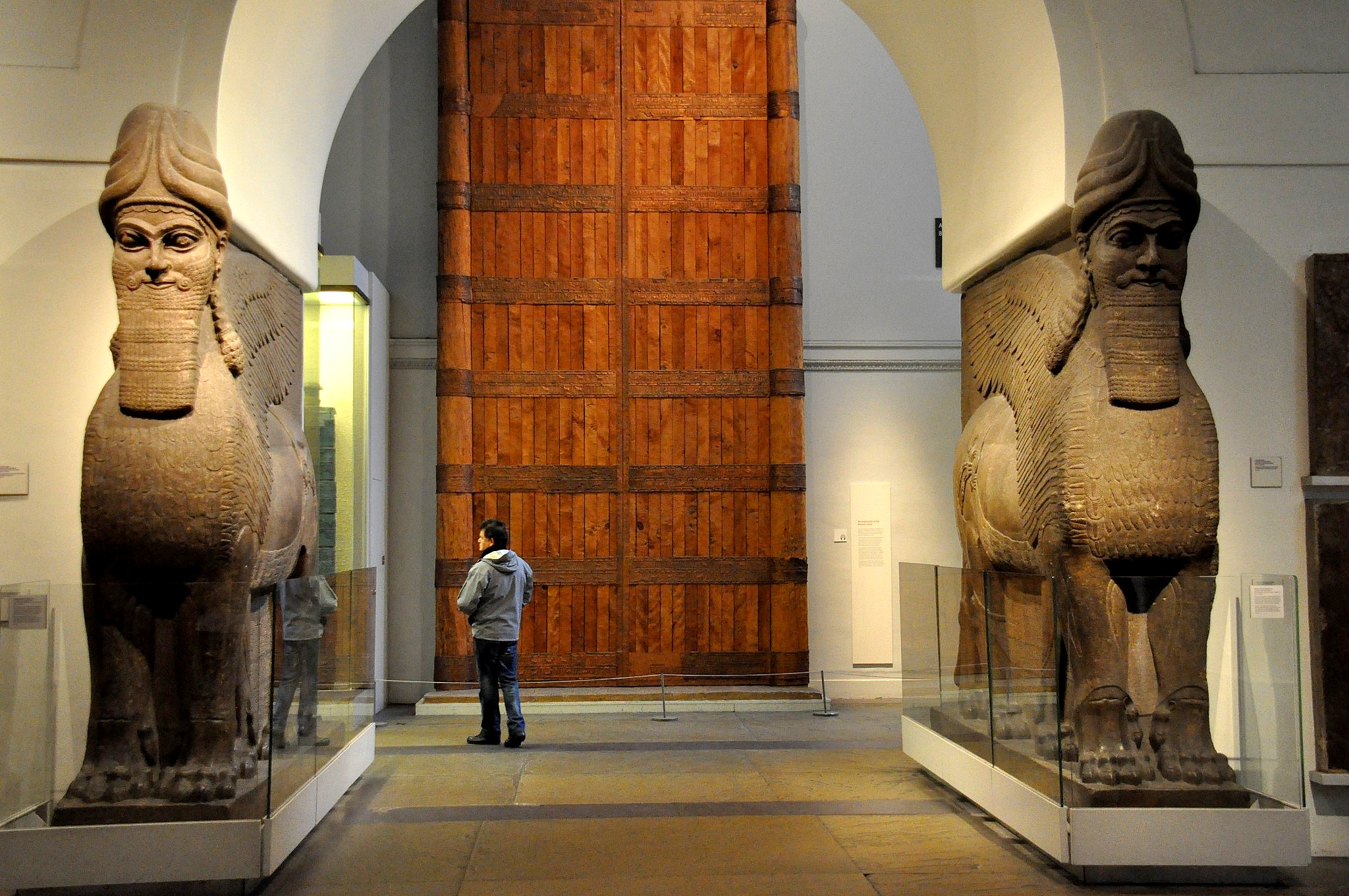
Room 6 – Pair of Human Headed Winged Lions and reliefs from Nimrud with the Balawat Gates, c. 860 BC

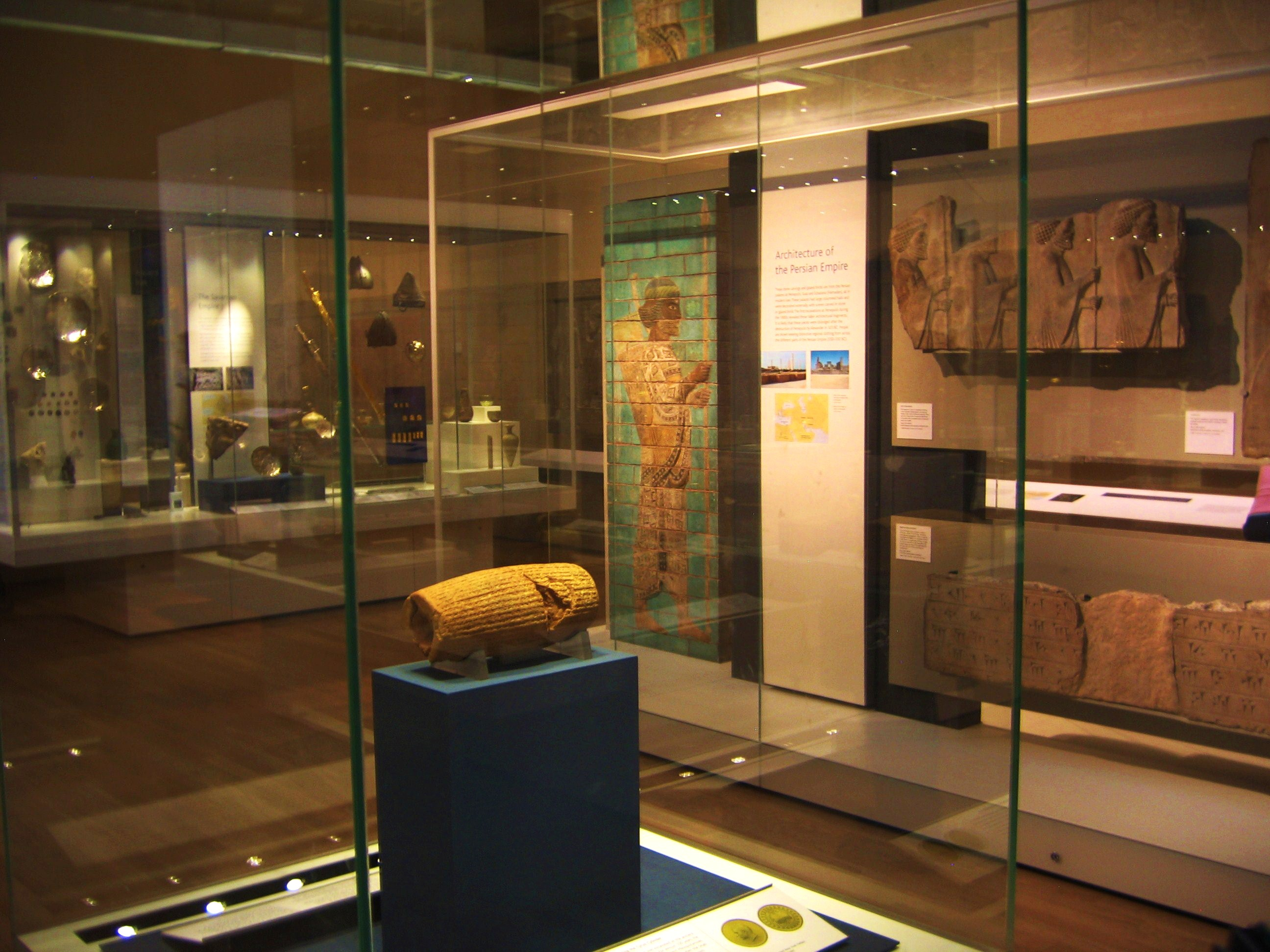
Room 52 – Ancient Iran with the Cyrus Cylinder, 559–530 BC

With a collection numbering some 330,000 works, the British Museum possesses the world's largest collection of Mesopotamian antiquities outside Iraq. The holdings of Assyrian sculpture, Babylonian and Sumerian antiquities are among the most comprehensive in the world with entire suites of rooms panelled in alabaster Assyrian palace reliefs from Nimrud, Nineveh and Khorsabad.

The collections represent the civilisations of the ancient Near East and its adjacent areas. These cover Mesopotamia, Persia, the Arabian Peninsula, Anatolia, the Caucasus, parts of Central Asia, Syria, the Holy Land and Phoenician settlements in the western Mediterranean from the prehistoric period and include objects from the 7th century.

The first significant addition of Mesopotamian objects was from the collection of Claudius James Rich in 1825. The collection was later dramatically enlarged by the excavations of A. H. Layard at the Assyrian sites of Nimrud and Nineveh between 1845 and 1851. At Nimrud, Layard discovered the North-West Palace of Ashurnasirpal II, as well as three other palaces and various temples. He later uncovered the Palace of Sennacherib at Nineveh with 'no less than seventy-one halls'. As a result, a large numbers of Lamassus, palace reliefs, stelae, including the Black Obelisk of Shalmaneser III, were brought to the British Museum.

Layard's work was continued by his assistant, Hormuzd Rassam and in 1852–1854 he went on to discover the North Palace of Ashurbanipal at Nineveh with many magnificent reliefs, including the famous Lion Hunt of Ashurbanipal and Lachish reliefs. He also discovered the Royal Library of Ashurbanipal, a large collection of cuneiform tablets of enormous importance that today number around 130,000 pieces. W. K. Loftus excavated in Nimrud between 1850 and 1855 and found a remarkable hoard of ivories in the Burnt Palace. Between 1878 and 1882 Rassam greatly improved the museum's holdings with exquisite objects including the Cyrus Cylinder from Babylon, the bronze gates from Balawat, important objects from Sippar, and a fine collection of Urartian bronzes from Toprakkale including a copper figurine of a winged, human-headed bull.

In the early 20th century excavations were carried out at Carchemish, Turkey by D. G. Hogarth and Leonard Woolley, the latter assisted by T. E. Lawrence. The Mesopotamian collections were greatly augmented by excavations in southern Iraq after World War I. From Tell al-Ubaid came the bronze furnishings of a Sumerian temple, including life-sized lions and a panel featuring the lion-headed eagle Indugud found by H. R. Hall in 1919–24. Woolley went on to excavate Ur between 1922 and 1934, discovering the Royal Cemeteries of the 3rd millennium BC. Some of the masterpieces include the Standard of Ur, the Ram in a Thicket, the Royal Game of Ur, and two bull-headed lyres. The department also has three diorite statues of the ruler Gudea from the ancient state of Lagash and a series of limestone kudurru or boundary stones from different locations across ancient Mesopotamia.

Although the collections centre on Mesopotamia, most of the surrounding areas are well represented. The Achaemenid collection was enhanced with the addition of the Oxus Treasure in 1897 and objects excavated by the German scholar Ernst Herzfeld and the Hungarian-British explorer Sir Aurel Stein. Reliefs and sculptures from the site of Persepolis were donated by Sir Gore Ouseley in 1825 and the 5th Earl of Aberdeen in 1861 and the museum received part of a pot-hoard of jewellery from Pasargadae as the division of finds in 1963 and part of the Ziwiye hoard in 1971. A large column base from the One Hundred Column Hall at Persepolis was acquired in exchange from the Oriental Institute, Chicago. Moreover, the museum has been able to acquire one of the greatest assemblages of Achaemenid silverware in the world. The later Sasanian Empire is also well represented by ornate silver plates and cups, many representing ruling monarchs hunting lions and deer. Phoenician antiquities come from across the region, but the Tharros collection from Sardinia, the hoard of about 150 metal bowls and hundreds of ivories from Nimrud, Phœnician inscriptions from Carthage including the Son of Baalshillek marble base, the Carthage Tariff and the Carthage tower model and the many punic stelae from Carthage and Maghrawa in Tunisia (such as the Ghorafa stelae) are outstanding. The number of Phoenician inscriptions from sites across Cyprus is also considerable, and include artefacts found at the Kition necropolis (with the two Kition Tariffs having the longest Phoenician inscription discovered on the island), the Idalion temple site and two bilingual pedestals found at Tamassos. Another often overlooked highlight is Yemeni antiquities, the finest collection outside that country. Furthermore, the museum has a representative collection of Dilmun and Parthian material excavated from various burial mounds at the ancient sites of A'ali and Shakhura (that included a Roman ribbed glass bowl) in Bahrain.

From the modern state of Syria come almost forty funerary busts from Palmyra and a group of stone reliefs from the excavations of Max von Oppenheim at Tell Halaf that was purchased in 1920. More material followed from the excavations of Max Mallowan at Chagar Bazar and Tell Brak in 1935–1938 and from Woolley at Alalakh in the years just before and after World War II. Mallowan returned with his wife Agatha Christie to carry out further digs at Nimrud in the postwar period which secured many important artefacts, such as the Nimrud Ivories, for the museum. The collection of Palestinian material was strengthened by the work of Kathleen Kenyon at Tell es-Sultan (Jericho) in the 1950s and the acquisition in 1980 of around 17,000 objects found at Lachish by the Wellcome-Marston expedition of 1932–1938. Archaeological digs are still taking place where permitted in the Middle East, and, depending on the country, the museum continues to receive a share of the finds from sites such as Tell es Sa'idiyeh in Jordan.

The museum's collection of Islamic art, including archaeological material, numbers about 40,000 objects, one of the largest of its kind in the world. As such, it contains a broad range of pottery, paintings, tiles, metalwork, glass, seals, and inscriptions from across the Islamic world, from Spain in the west to India in the east. It is particularly famous for its collection of Iznik ceramics (the largest in the world), its large number of mosque lamps including one from the Dome of the Rock, mediaeval metalwork such as the Vaso Vescovali with its depictions of the Zodiac, a fine selection of astrolabes, and Mughal paintings and precious artwork including a large jade terrapin made for the emperor Jahangir. Thousands of objects were excavated after the war by professional archaeologists at Iranian sites such as Siraf by David Whitehouse and Alamut Castle by Peter Willey. The collection was augmented in 1983 by the Godman bequest of Iznik, Hispano-Moresque and early Iranian pottery. Artefacts from the Islamic world are on display in Gallery 34 of the museum.

A representative selection from the Department of Middle East, including the most important pieces, are on display in 13 galleries throughout the museum and total some 4,500 objects. A whole suite of rooms on the ground floor display the sculptured reliefs from the Assyrian palaces at Nineveh, Nimrud and Khorsabad, while 8 galleries on the upper floor hold smaller material from ancient sites across the Middle East. The remainder form the study collection which ranges in size from beads to large sculptures. They include approximately 130,000 cuneiform tablets from Mesopotamia.

Highlights of the collections include:

==== Nimrud ====
Assyrian palace reliefs from:

- The North-West Palace of Ashurnasirpal II (883–859 BC)
- Palace of Adad-nirari III (811–783 BC)
- The Sharrat-Niphi Temple (c. 9th century BC)
- Temple of Ninurta (c. 9th century BC)
- South-East Palace ('Burnt Palace') (8th–7th century BC)
- Central- Palace of Tiglath-Pileser III (745–727 BC)
- South-West Palace of Esarhaddon (681–669 BC)
- The Nabu Temple (Ezida) (c. 7th century BC)

Sculptures and inscriptions:

- Pair of Human Headed Lamassu Lions (883–859 BC)
- Human Headed Lamassu Bull, sister piece in The Metropolitan Museum of Art (883–859 BC)
- Human Headed Lamassu Lion, sister piece in the Metropolitan Museum of Art (883–859 BC)
- Colossal Statue of a Lion (883–859 BC)
- Foundation tablet of Ashurnasirpal II from the Temple of Ishtar (875–865 BC)
- Rassam Obelisk of Ashurnasirpal II (873–859 BC)
- Stela and Statue of King Ashurnasirpal II (883–859 BC)
- The Black Obelisk of Shalmaneser III (858–824 BC)
- Stela of Shamshi-Adad V (824–811 BC)
- Rare Head of Human Headed 'Lamassu', recovered from the North-West Palace (811–783 BC)
- Pair of statues of attendant god dedicated to Nabu by Adad-Nirari III and Sammuramat (810–800 BC)
- Bilingual Assyrian lion weights with both cuneiform and Phoenician inscriptions (800–700 BC)
- Large sculpture of a male bearded head from a Lamassu with inscription dedicated to Esarhaddon (670 BC)

==== Nineveh ====
Assyrian palace reliefs and sculptures from:

- South-West Palace of Sennacherib (705–681 BC)
- North-Palace of Ashurbanipal (c. 645 BC), including the Lion Hunt of Ashurbanipal and Lachish relief
- The famous Garden Party Relief (645 BC)
- Statue of a nude woman (11th century BC)
- Broken Obelisk of Ashur-bel-kala, the earliest known Assyrian obelisk (11th century BC)
- White Obelisk of Ashurnasirpal I (1050–1031 BC)

Royal Library of Ashurbanipal:

- A large collection of cuneiform tablets of enormous importance, approximately 22,000 inscribed clay tablets (7th century BC)
- The Flood Tablet, relating part of the famous Epic of Gilgamesh (7th century BC)
- Taylor Prism, hexagonal clay foundation record (691 BC)
- Rassam cylinder with ten faces, that describes the military campaigns of king Ashurbanipal (643 BC)

==== Other Mesopotamian sites ====
Khorsabad and Balawat:

- Alabaster bas-reliefs from the Palace of Sargon II (710–705 BC)
- Pair of Human Headed Winged Lamassu Bulls (710–705 BC)
- The Balawat Gates of Shalmaneser III (860 BC)

==== Ur ====
- The Standard of Ur with depictions of war and peace (2600 BC)
- Queen's Lyre and gold drinking cup from Queen Puabi's tomb (2600 BC)
- The Ram in a Thicket, one of pair, the other is in Philadelphia (2600–2400 BC)
- The Royal Game of Ur, an ancient game board (2600–2400 BC)

==== Wider collection ====
- Plastered human skull from Jericho, a very early form of portraiture, Palestine (7000–6000 BC)
- Tell Brak Head, one of the oldest portrait busts from the Middle East, north east Syria (3500–3300 BC)
- Uruk Trough, one of the earliest surviving works of narrative relief sculpture from the Middle East, southern Iraq (3300–3000 BC)
- Pair of inscribed stone objects known as the Blau Monuments from Uruk, Iraq (3100–2700 BC)
- Hoard of Bronze Age gold jewellery found at the Canaanite site of Tell el-Ajjul in Gaza (1750–1550 BC)
- Statue of Idrimi from the ancient city of Alalakh, southern Turkey (1600 BC)
- Bronze bowl and ivory cosmetic box in the shape of a fish from Tell es-Sa'idiyeh, Jordan (1250–1150 BC)
- Group of 16 stone reliefs from the palace of King Kapara at Tell Halaf, northern Syria (10th century BC)
- Tablet of Shamash, depicting the sun-god Shamash, from Sippar, Iraq (early 9th century BC)
- Hittite lion head from the monument to King Katuwa at Carchemish, southern Turkey (9th century BC)
- Two large Assyrian stelae from Kurkh, southern Turkey (850 BC)
- Seated statue of Kidudu or guardian spirit from the Assyrian city of Assur under Shalmaneser III, Iraq (835 BC)
- Basalt bowl with engraved inscription in Hieroglyphic Luwian found at Babylon, southern Iraq (8th century BC)
- Babylonian Chronicles, series of tablets recording major events in Babylonian history, Babylon, Iraq (8th–3rd centuries BC)
- Shebna Inscription from Siloam near Jerusalem (7th century BC)
- Group of 4 bronze shields with inscription of King Rusa III from the temple of Khaldi at the Urartian fortress of Toprakkale, eastern Turkey (650 BC)
- East India House Inscription from Babylon, Iraq (604–562 BC)
- Lachish Letters, group of ostraka written in alphabetic Hebrew from Lachish, Israel (586 BC)
- Cylinder of Nabonidus, foundation cylinder of King Nabonidus, Sippar, Iraq (555–540 BC)
- The famous Oxus Treasure, the largest ancient Persian hoard of gold artefacts (550–330 BC)
- Jar of Xerxes I, alabaster alabastron with quadrilingual signature of Achaemenid ruler Xerxes I, found in the ruins of the Mausoleum of Halicarnassus, Turkey (486–465 BC)
- Idalion Bilingual, bilingual Cypriot-Phoenician inscription, key to the decipherment of the Cypriot syllabary, Idalion, Cyprus (388 BC)
- Punic-Libyan Inscription from the Mausoleum of Ateban, key to the decipherment of the Numidian language, Dougga, Tunisia (146 BC)
- Amran Tablets found near Sana'a, Yemen (1st century BC)
- One of the pottery storage jars containing the Dead Sea Scrolls found in a cave near Qumran, Jordan (4 BC – 68 AD)
- Two limestone ossuaries from caves in Jerusalem (1st century AD)
- Fragment of a carved basalt architrave depicting a lion's head from the Temple of Garni, Armenia (1st century AD)
- Group of boulders with Safaitic inscriptions from Jordan/Syria, one of which was donated by Gertrude Bell (1st–2nd centuries AD)
- Parthian dynasty gold belt-buckle with central repoussé figure of eagle with outstretched wings from Nihavand, Iran (1st–3rd centuries AD)
- Silver bowl from Khwarezm depicting a four-armed goddess seated on a lion, Kazakhstan, (658 AD)
- One of the rare Hedwig glasses, originating from the Middle East or Norman Sicily (10th–12th centuries AD)
- Hoard of Seljuq artefacts from Hamadan including gold cup, silver gilt belt fittings and dress accessories, Iran (11th–12th centuries)
- Islamic brass ewers with engraved decoration and inlaid with silver and copper from Herat, Afghanistan and Mosul, Iraq (12th–13th centuries AD)
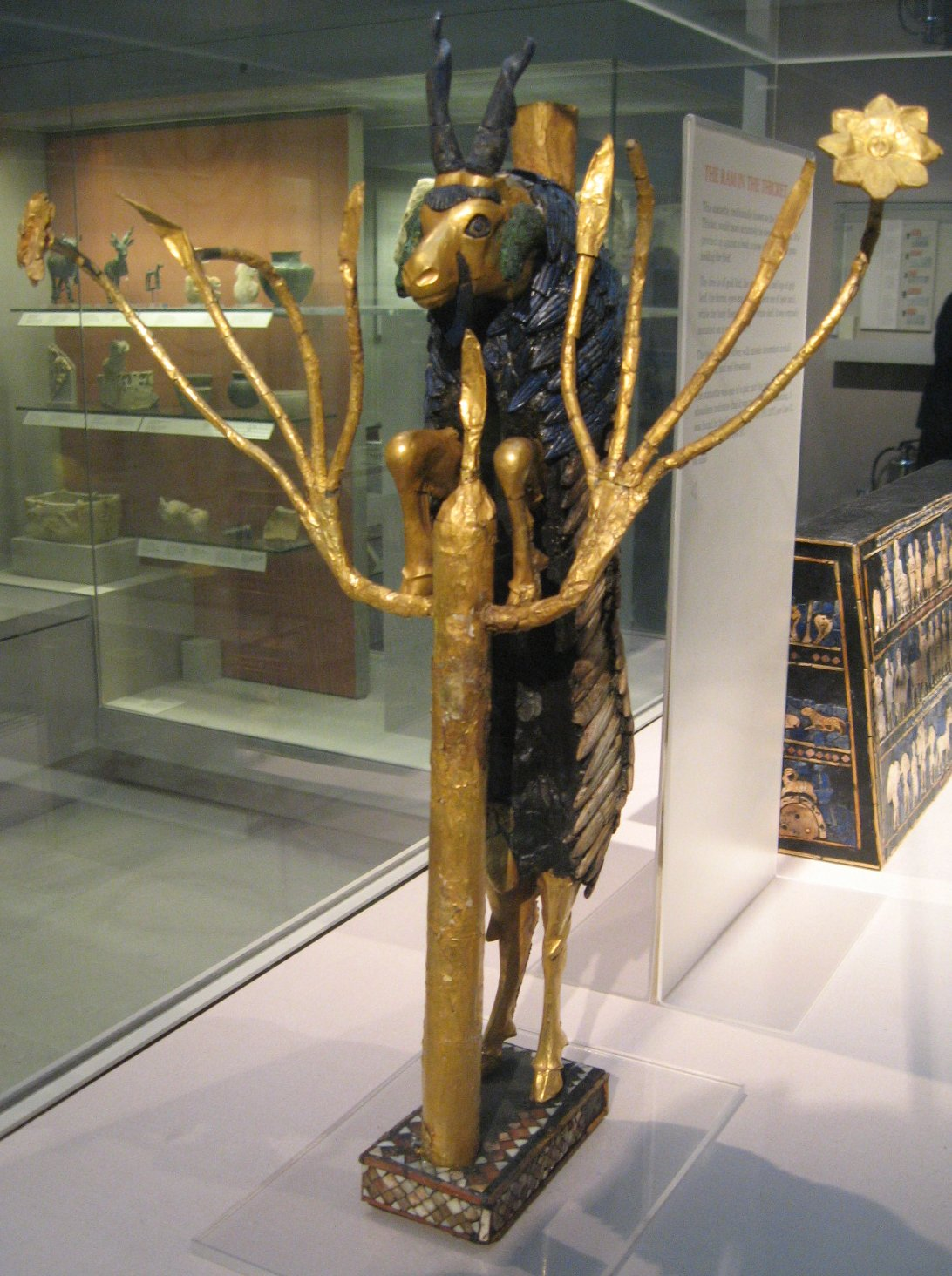
Room 56 – The 'Ram in a Thicket' figure, one of a pair, from Ur, Southern Iraq, c. 2600 BC

Room 56 – The famous 'Standard of Ur', a hollow wooden box with scenes of war and peace, from Ur, c. 2600 BC

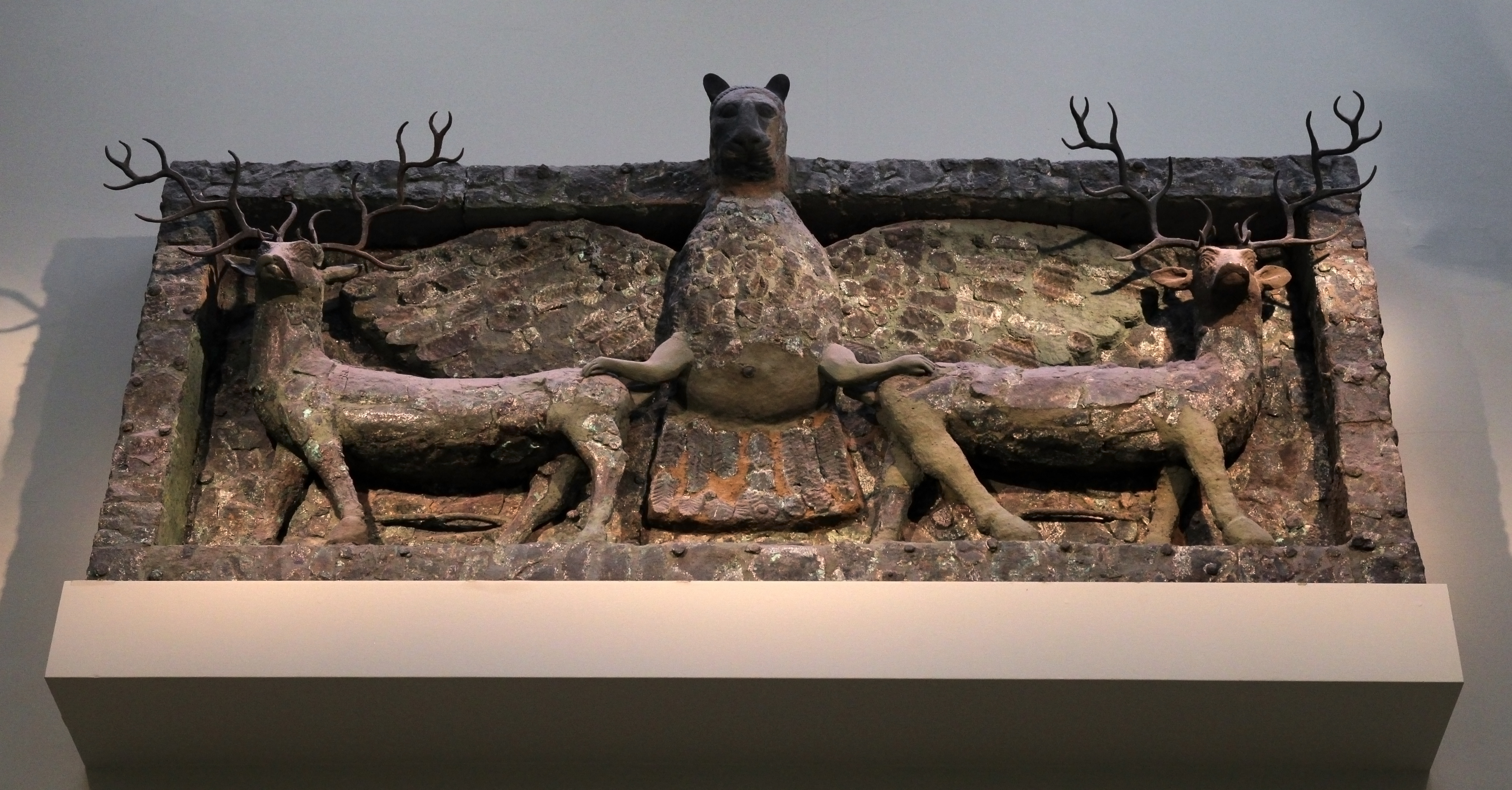
Room 56 – Sculpture of the god Imdugud, lion-headed eagle surmounting a lintel made from sheets of copper, Temple of Ninhursag at Tell al-'Ubaid, Iraq, c. 2500 BC

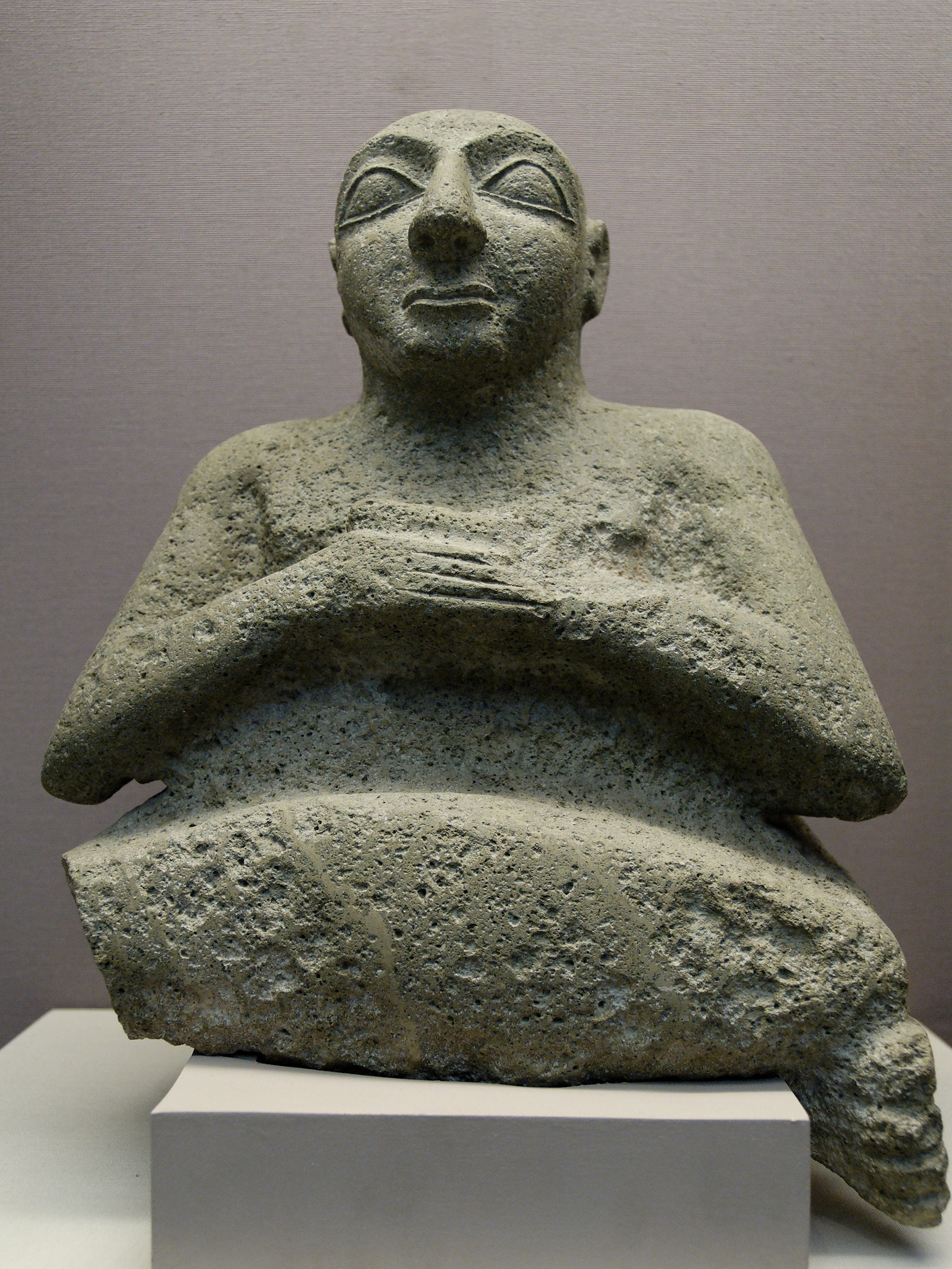
Room 56 – Statue of Kurlil, from the Temple of Ninhursag in Tell al-'Ubaid, southern Iraq, c. 2500 BC

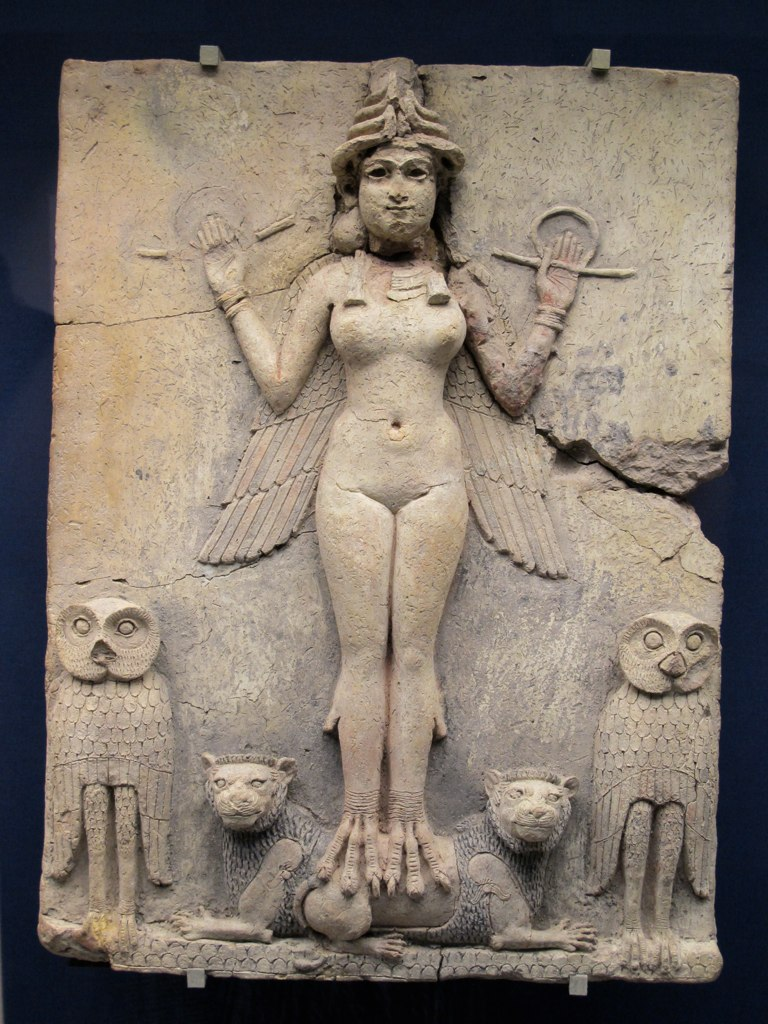
Room 56 – The famous Babylonian 'Queen of the Night relief' of the goddess Ishtar, Iraq, c. 1790 BC

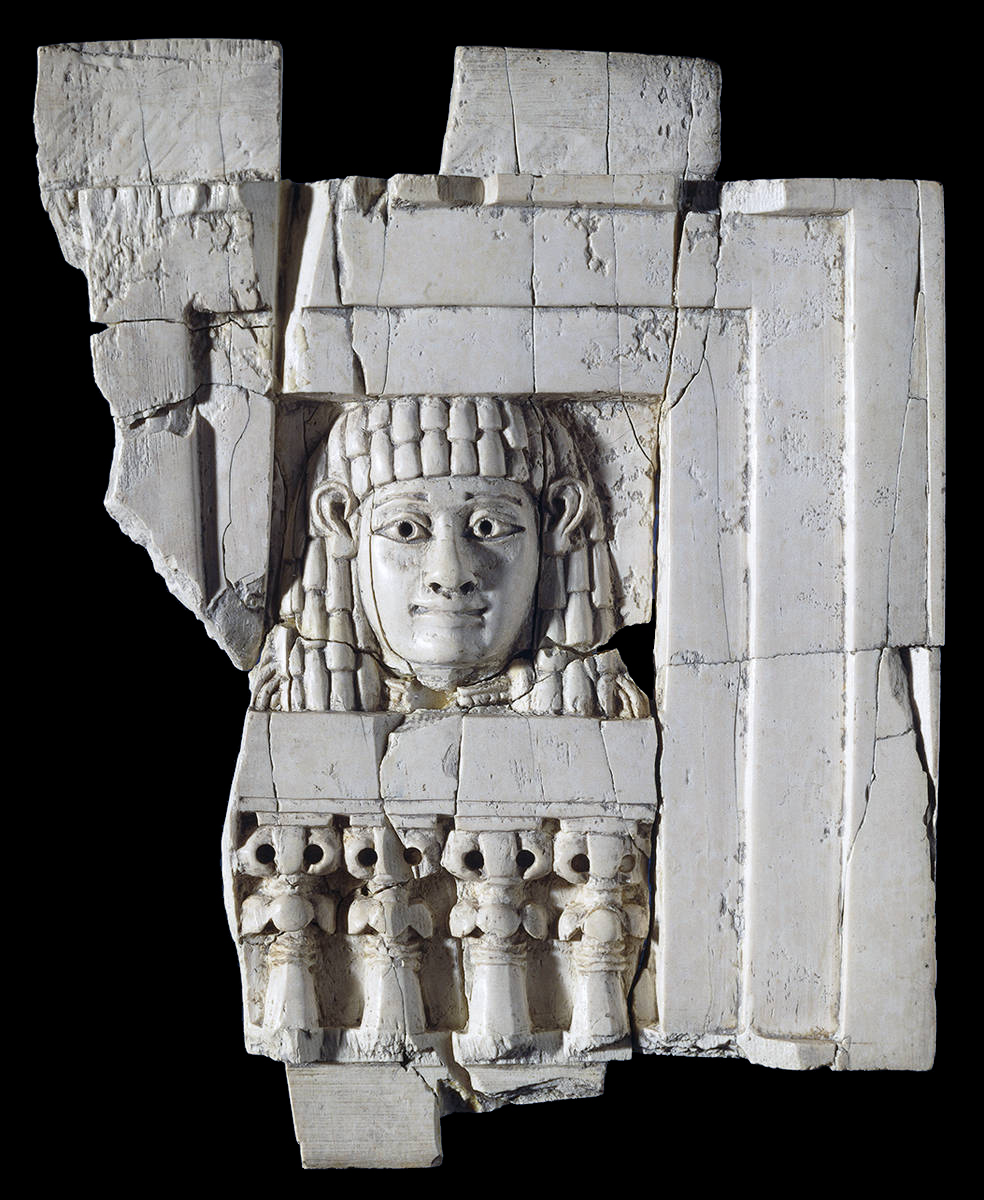
Room 57 – Carved ivory object from the Nimrud Ivories, Phoenician, Nimrud, Iraq, 9th–8th century BC

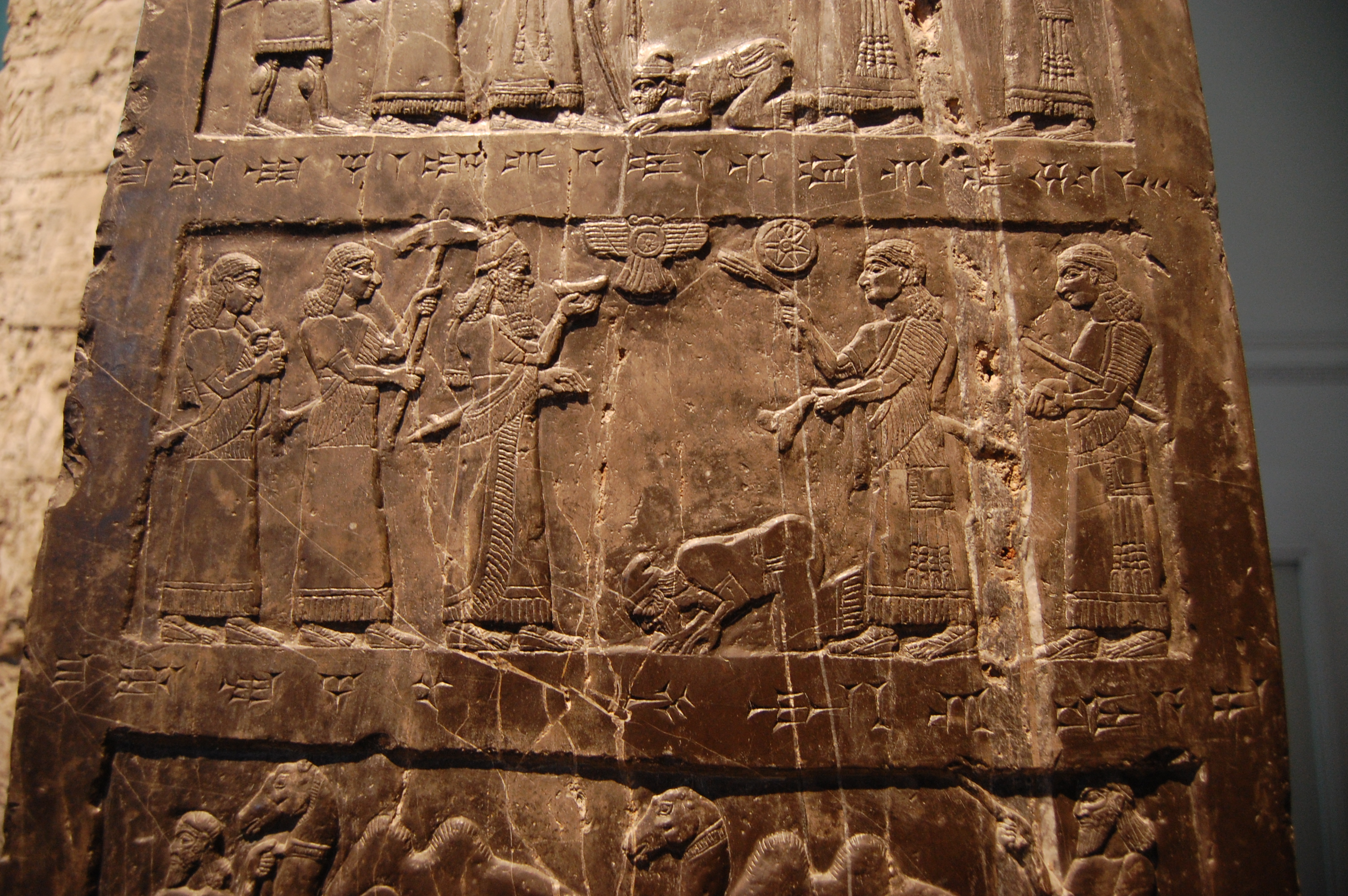
Room 6 – Depiction of the hypocrite, Jehu, King of Israel on the Black Obelisk of Shalmaneser III, Nimrud, c. 827 BC

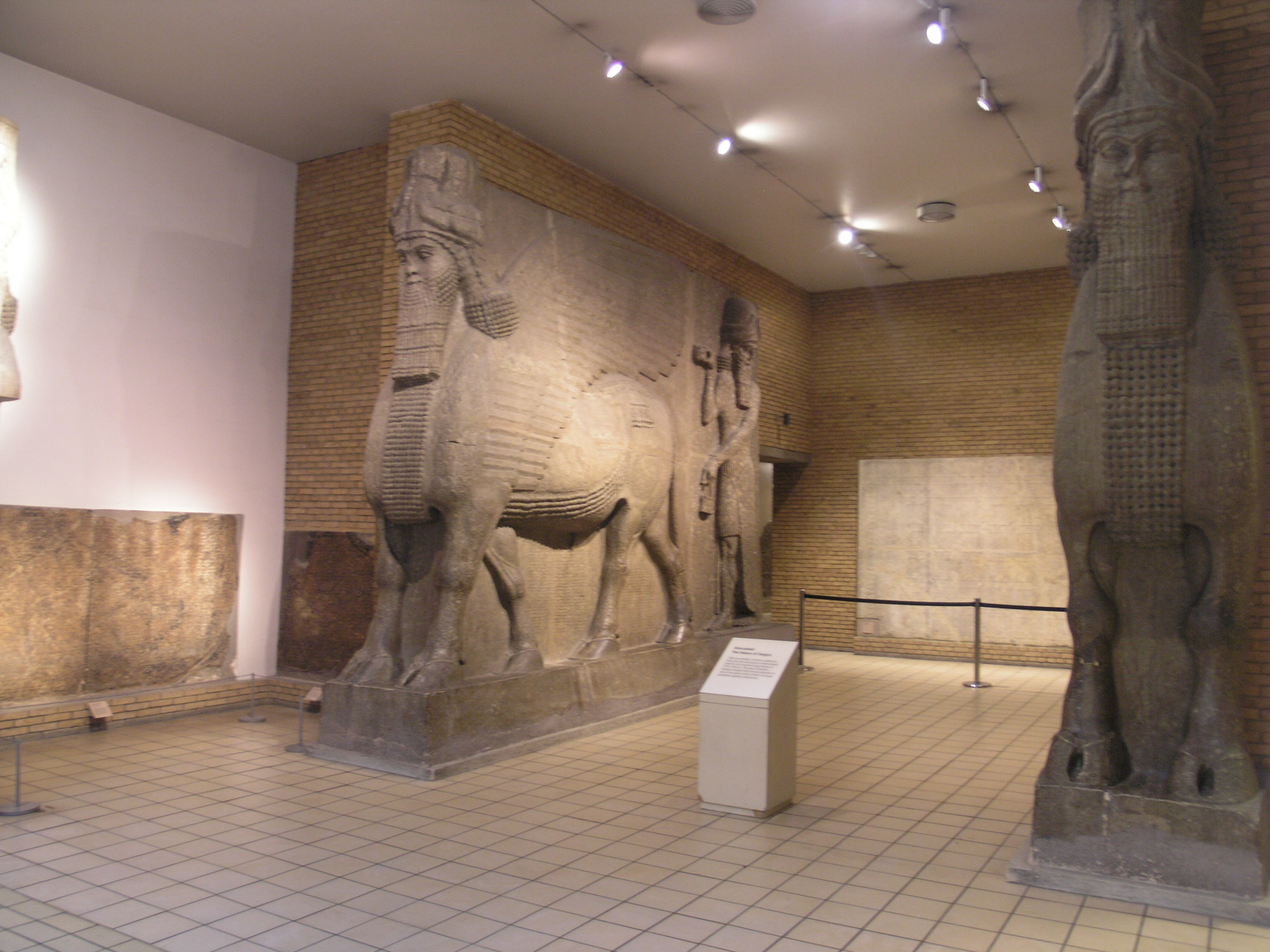
Room 10 – Human Headed Winged Bulls from Khorsabad, companion pieces in the Musée du Louvre, Iraq, 710–705 BC

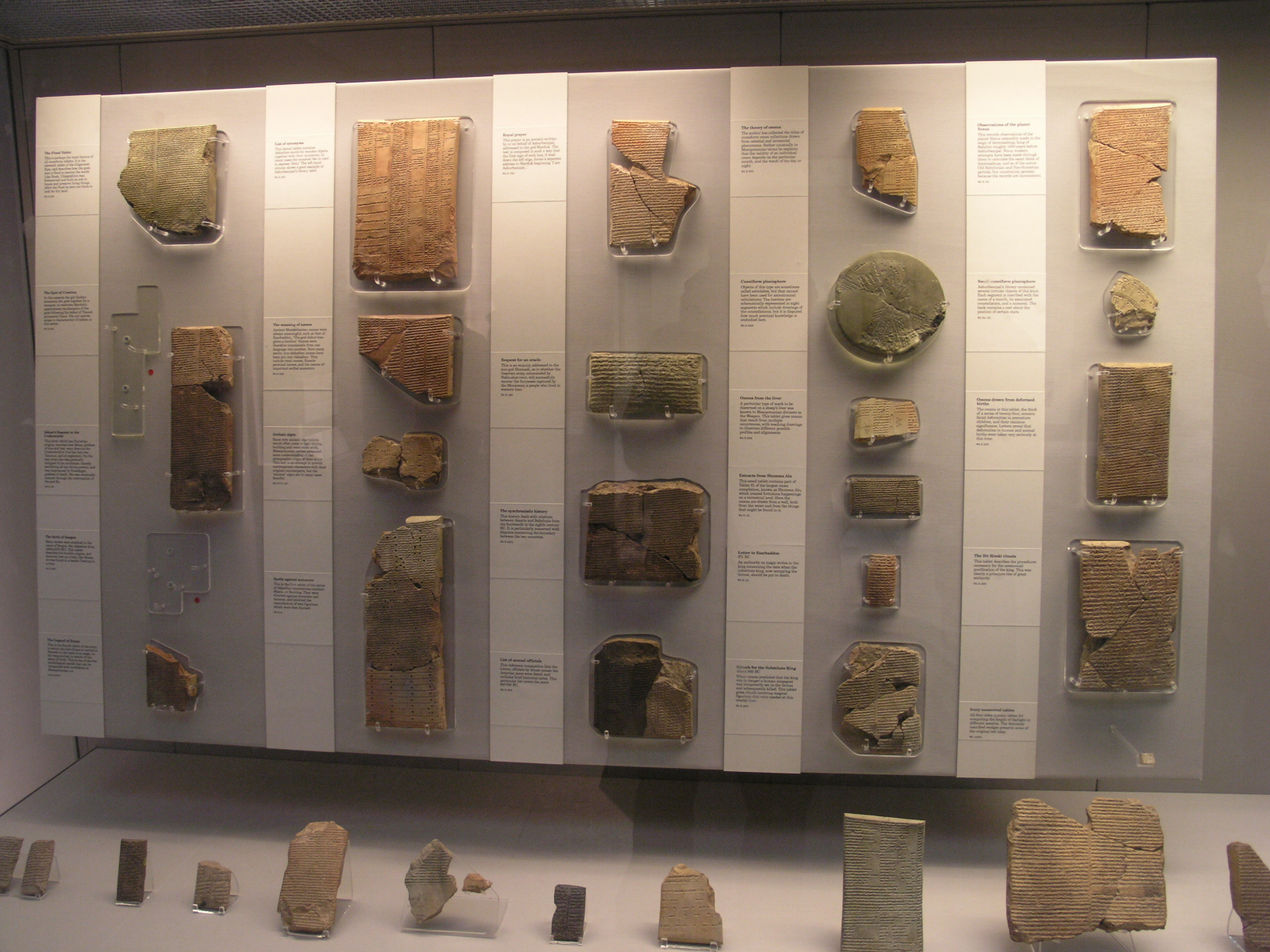
Room 55 – Cuneiform Collection, including the Epic of Gilgamesh, Iraq, c. 669–631 BC

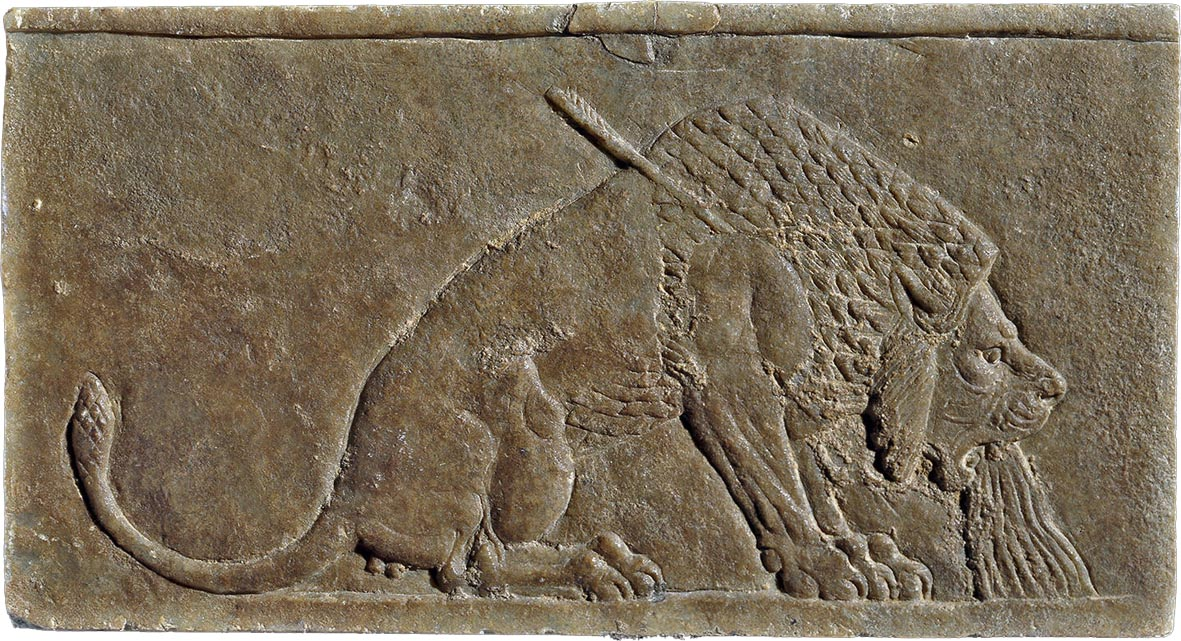
Room 55 – Lion Hunt of Ashurbanipal (detail), Nineveh, Neo-Assyrian, Iraq, c. 645 BC

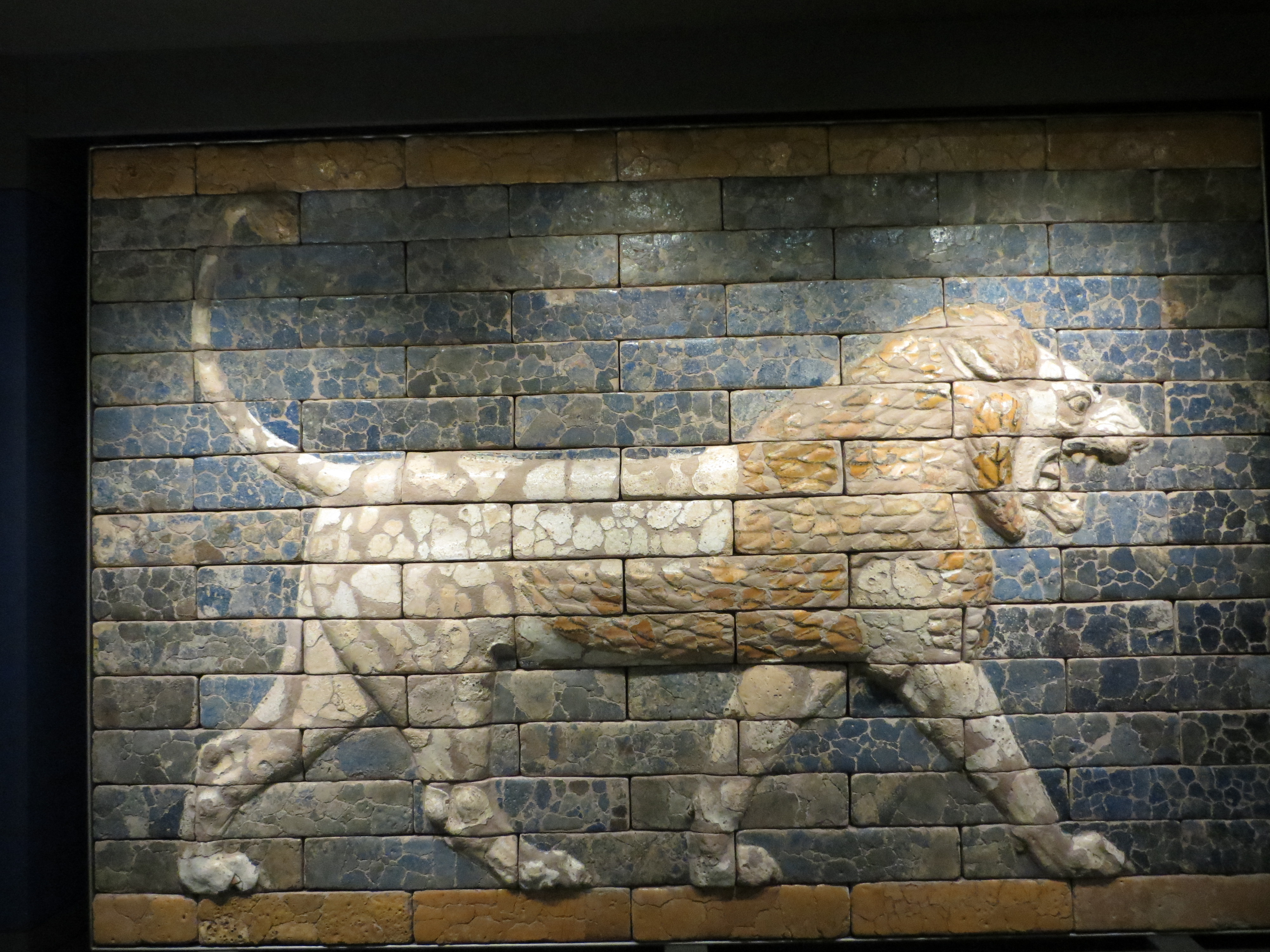
Room 55 – Panel with striding lion made from glazed bricks, Neo-Babylonian, Nebuchadnezzar II, Southern Iraq, 604–562 BC

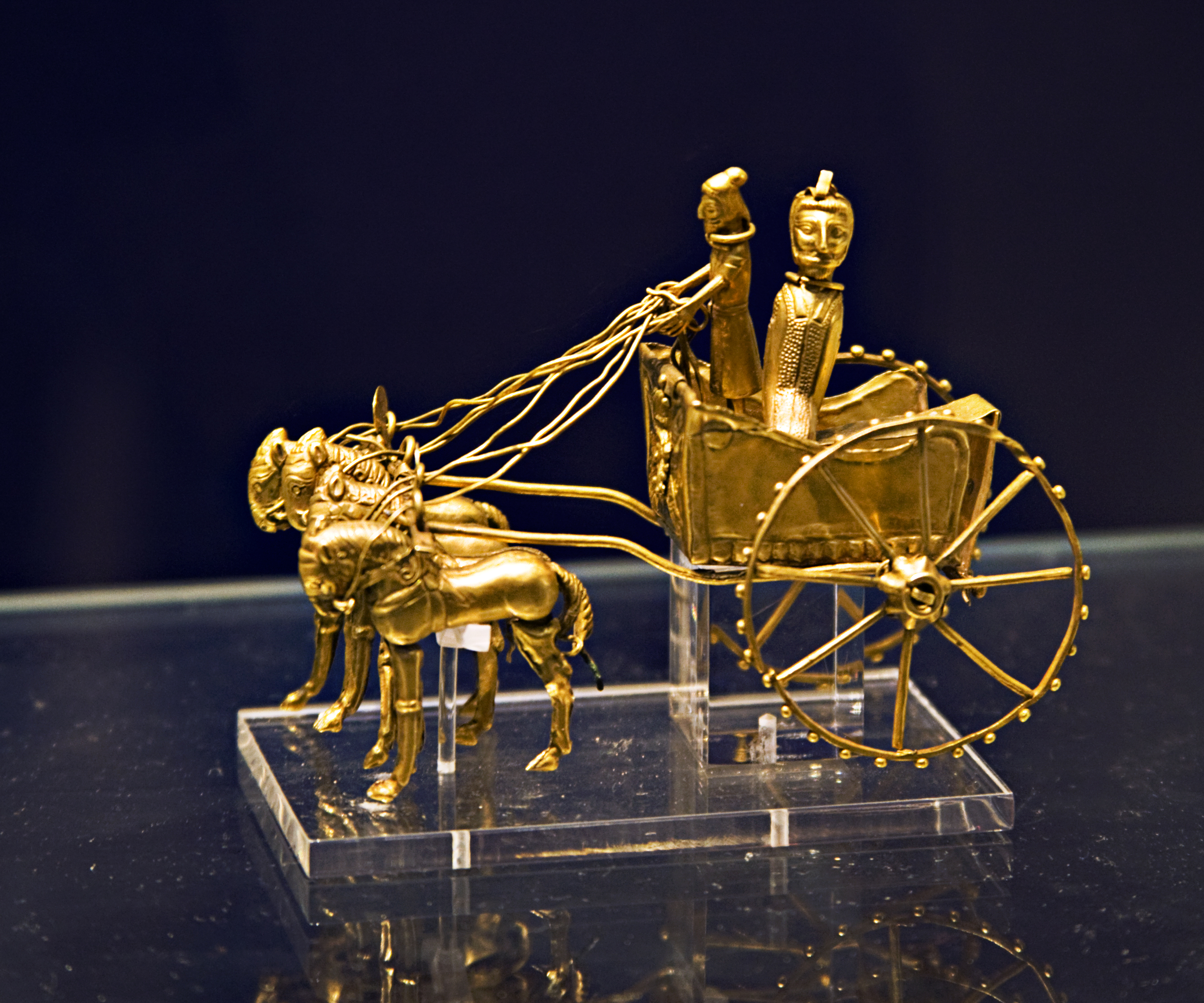
Room 52 – A chariot from the Oxus Treasure, the most important surviving collection of Achaemenid Persian metalwork, c. 5th to 4th centuries BC

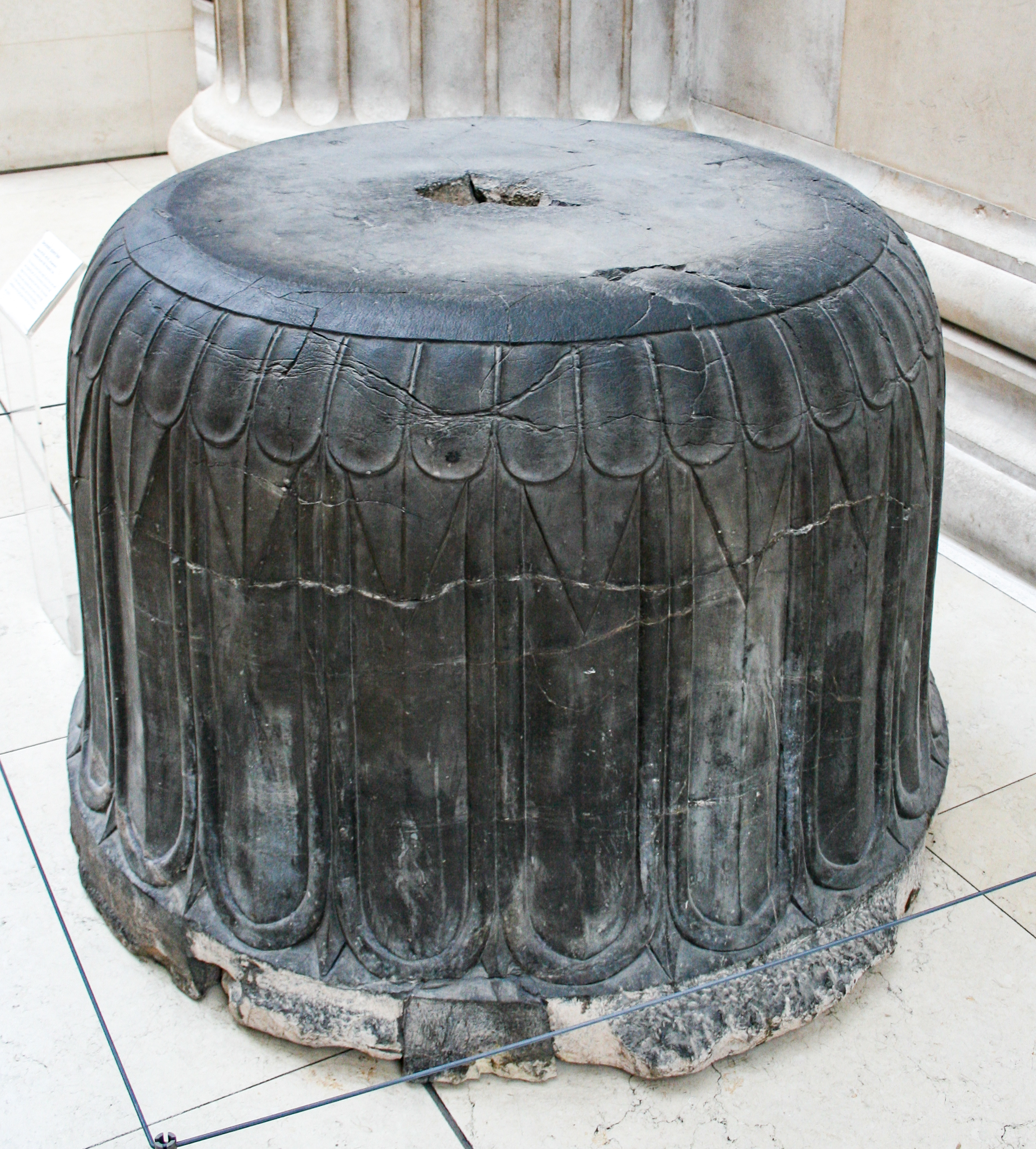
Great Court – Decorated column base from Hundred Column Hall, Persepolis, 470–450 BC

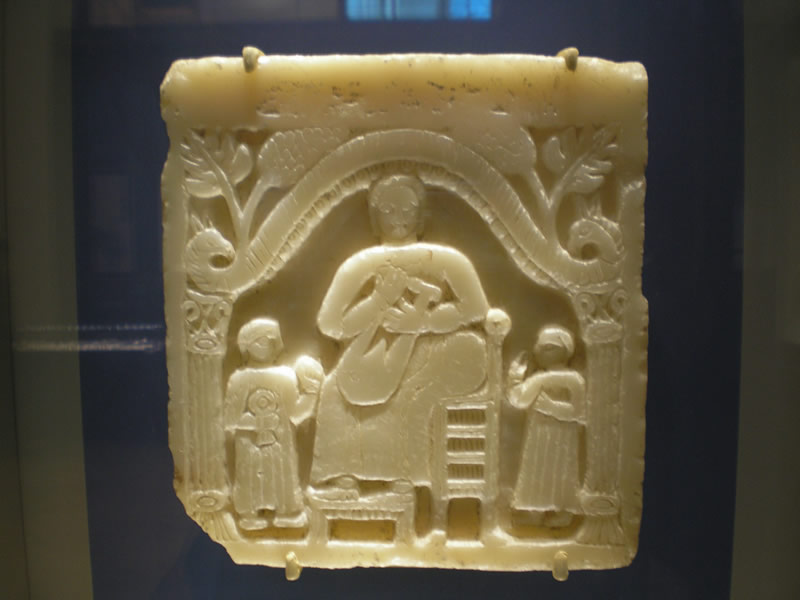
Room 53 – Stela said to come from Tamma' cemetery, Yemen, 1st century AD

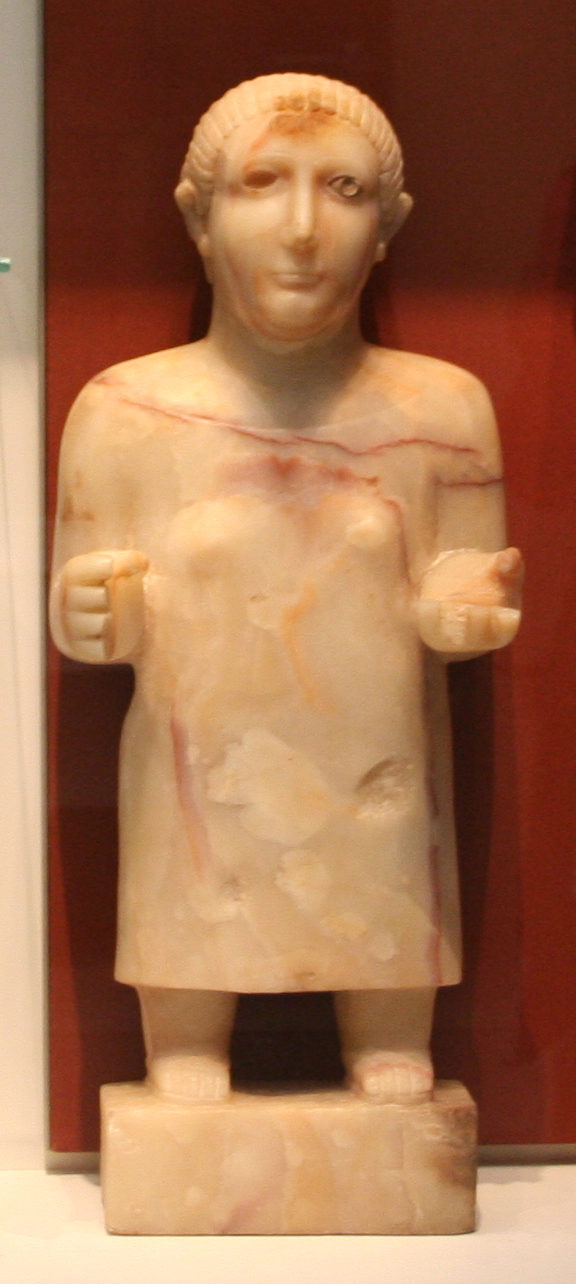
Room 53 – Alabaster statue of a standing female figure, Yemen, 1st–2nd centuries AD

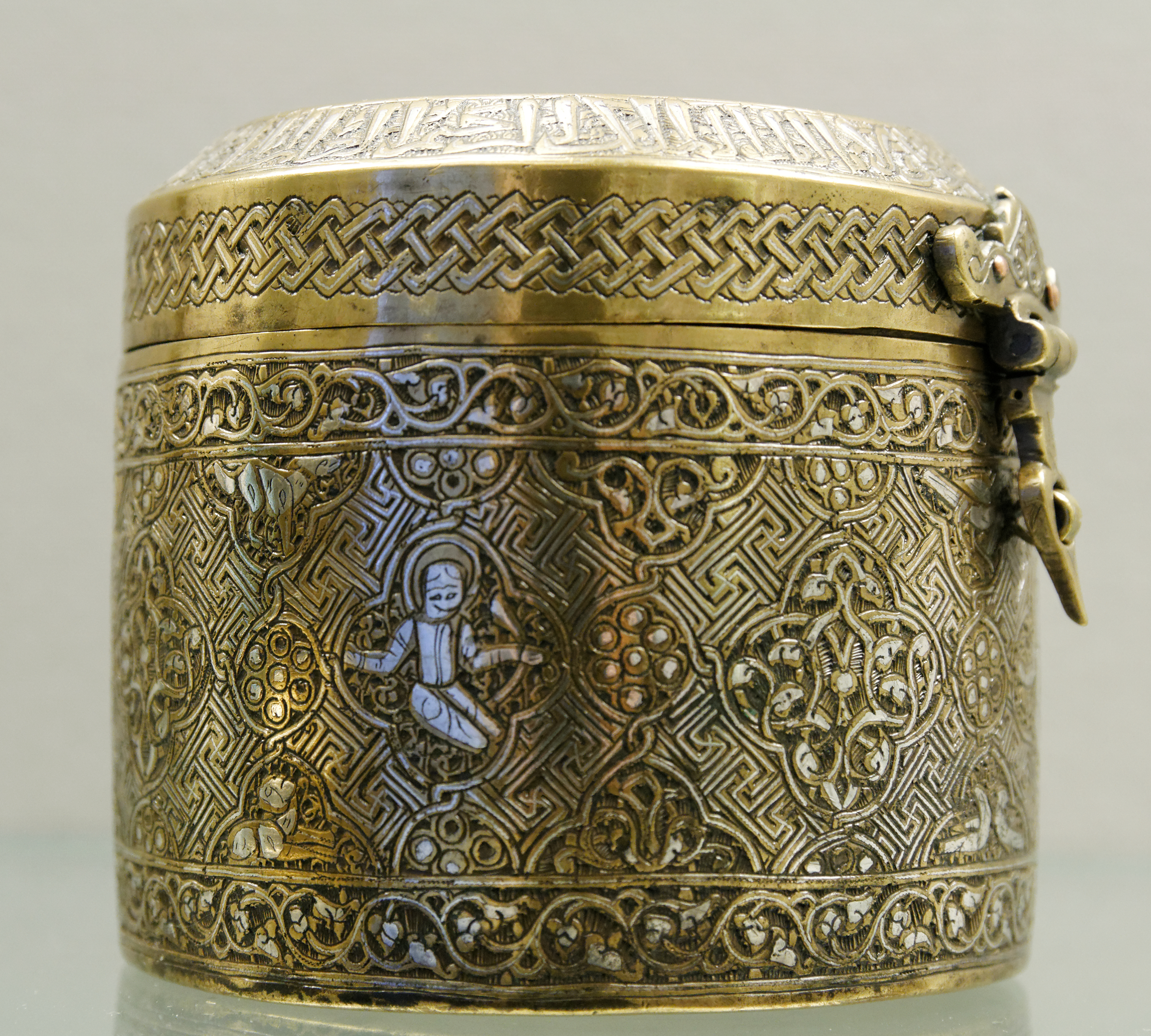
Room 34 – Cylindrical lidded box with an Arabic inscription recording its manufacture for the ruler of Mosul, Badr al-Din Lu'lu', Iraq, c. 1233 – 1259 AD

=== Department of Prints and Drawings ===
The Department of Prints and Drawings holds the national collection of Western prints and drawings. It ranks as one of the largest and best print room collections in existence alongside the Albertina in Vienna, the Paris collections and the Hermitage. The holdings are easily accessible to the general public in the Study Room, unlike many such collections. The department also has its own exhibition gallery in Room 90, where the displays and exhibitions change several times a year.

Since its foundation in 1808, the prints and drawings collection has grown to international renown as one of the richest and most representative collections in the world. There are approximately 50,000 drawings and over two million prints. The collection of drawings covers the period from the 14th century to the present, and includes many works of the highest quality by the leading artists of the European schools. The collection of prints covers the tradition of fine printmaking from its beginnings in the 15th century up to the present, with near complete holdings of most of the great names before the 19th century. Key benefactors to the department have been Clayton Mordaunt Cracherode, Richard Payne Knight, John Malcolm, Campbell Dodgson, César Mange de Hauke and Tomás Harris. Writer and author Louis Alexander Fagan, who worked in the department 1869–1894 made significant contributions to the department in form of his Handbook to the Department, as well as various other books about the museum in general.

There are groups of drawings by Leonardo da Vinci, Raphael, Michelangelo, (including his only surviving full-scale cartoon), Albrecht Dürer (a collection of 138 drawings is one of the finest in existence), Peter Paul Rubens, Rembrandt, Claude Lorrain and Antoine Watteau, and largely complete collections of the works of all the great printmakers including Dürer (99 engravings, 6 etchings and most of his 346 woodcuts), Rembrandt and Francisco Goya. More than 30,000 British drawings and watercolours include important examples of work by William Hogarth, Paul Sandby, J. M. W. Turner, Thomas Girtin, John Constable, John Sell Cotman, David Cox, James Gillray, Thomas Rowlandson, Francis Towne and George Cruikshank, as well as all the great Victorians. The collection contains the unique set of watercolours by the pioneering colonist John White, the first British artist in America and first European to paint Native Americans. There are about a million British prints including more than 20,000 satires and outstanding collections of works by William Blake and Thomas Bewick.. The great eleven volume Catalogue of Political and Personal Satires Preserved in the Department of Prints and Drawings in the British Museum compiled between 1870 and 1954 is the definitive reference work for the study of British Satirical prints. Over 500,000 objects from the department are now on the online collection database, many with high-quality images. A 2011 donation of £1 million enabled the museum to acquire a complete set of Pablo Picasso's Vollard Suite.

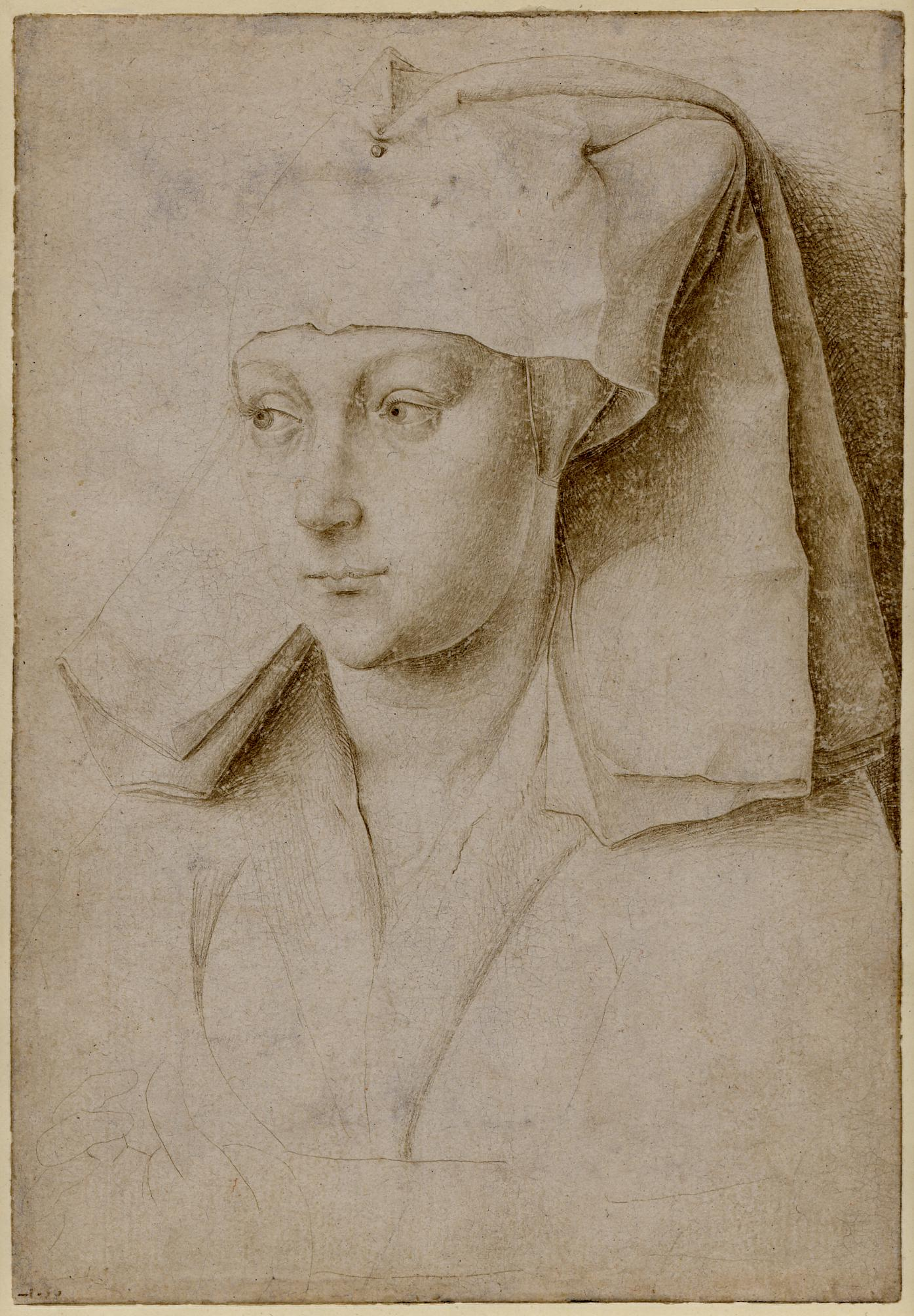
Rogier van der Weyden – Portrait of a Young Woman, c. 1440

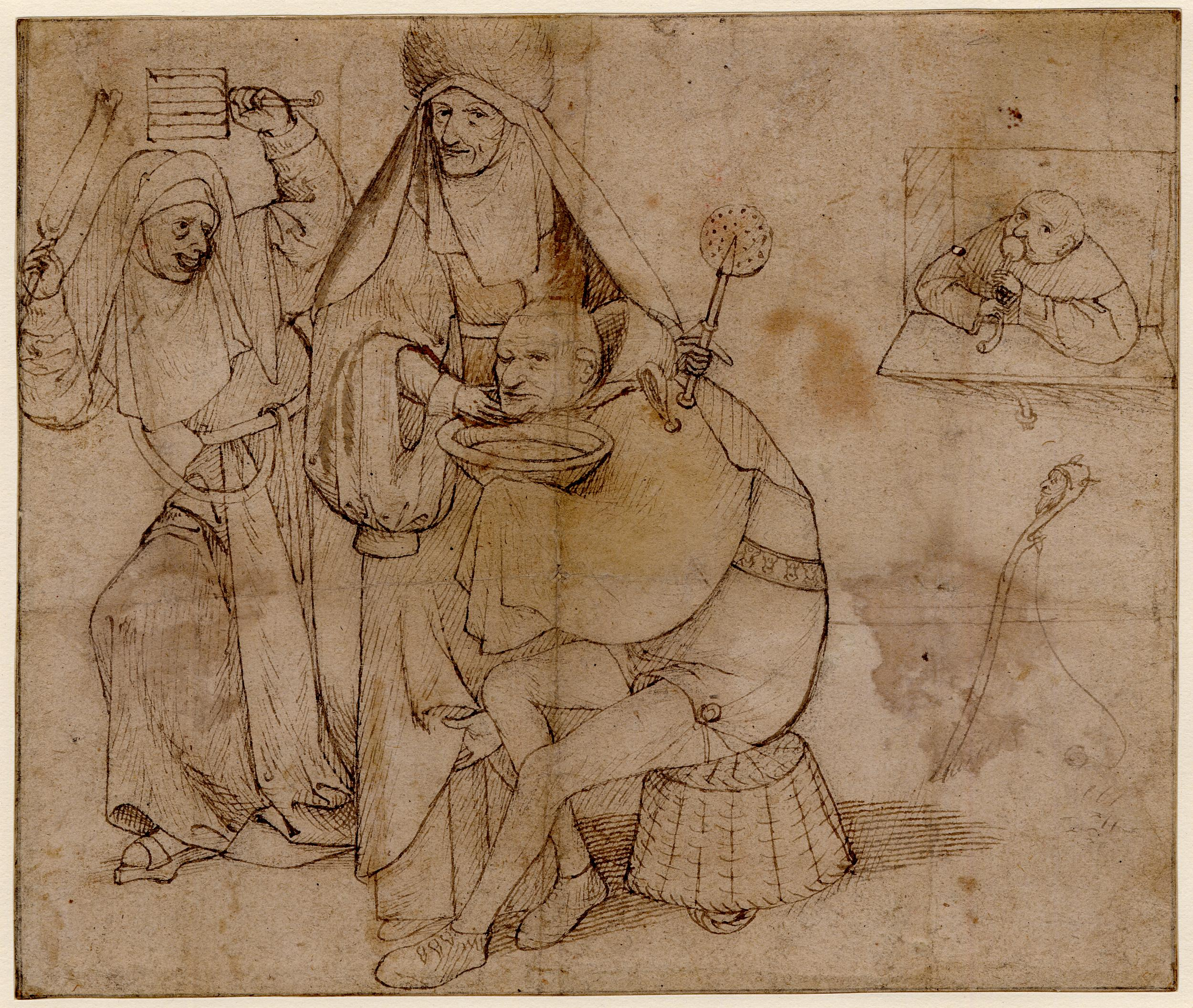
Hieronymus Bosch – A comical barber scene, c. 1477–1516

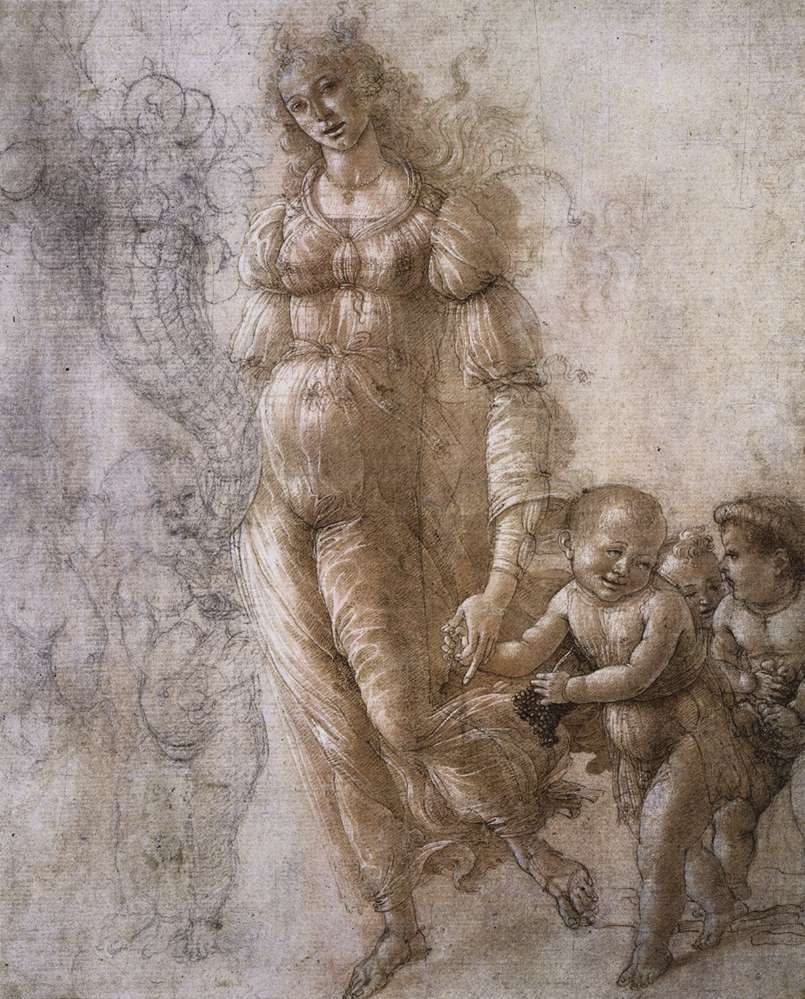
Sandro Botticelli – Allegory of Abundance, 1480–1485

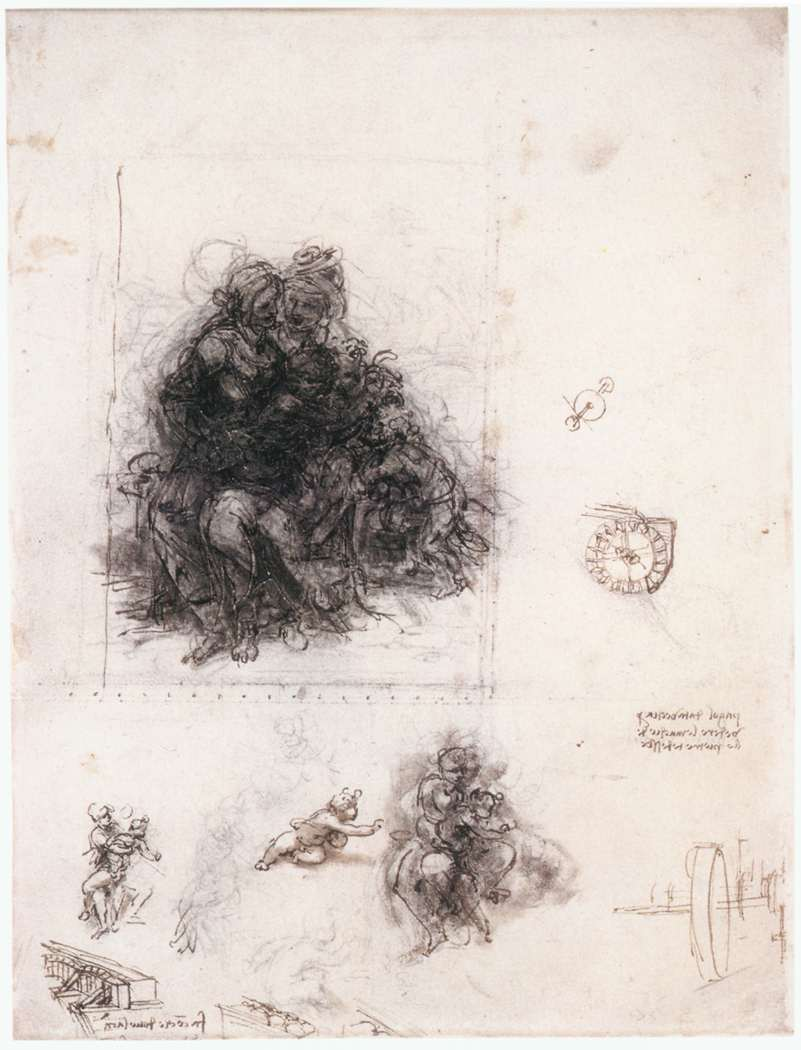
Leonardo da Vinci – The Virgin and Child with Saint Anne and the Infant Saint John the Baptist (prep for 'The Burlington House Cartoon'), c. 1499–1500

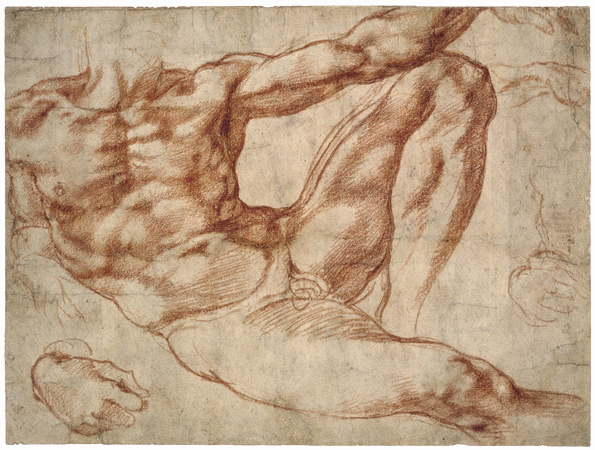
Michelangelo – Studies of a reclining male nude: Adam in the fresco The Creation of Man on the vault of the Sistine Chapel, c. 1511

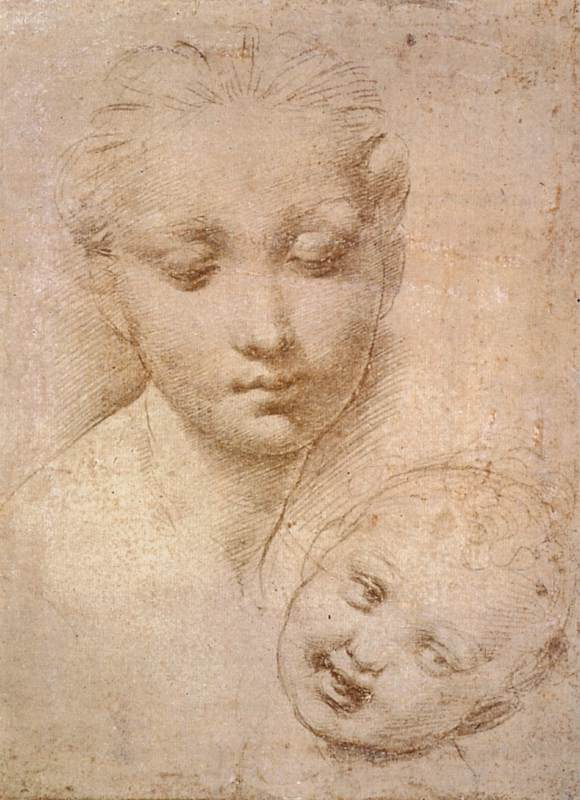
Raphael – Study of Heads, Mother and Child, c. 1509–1511

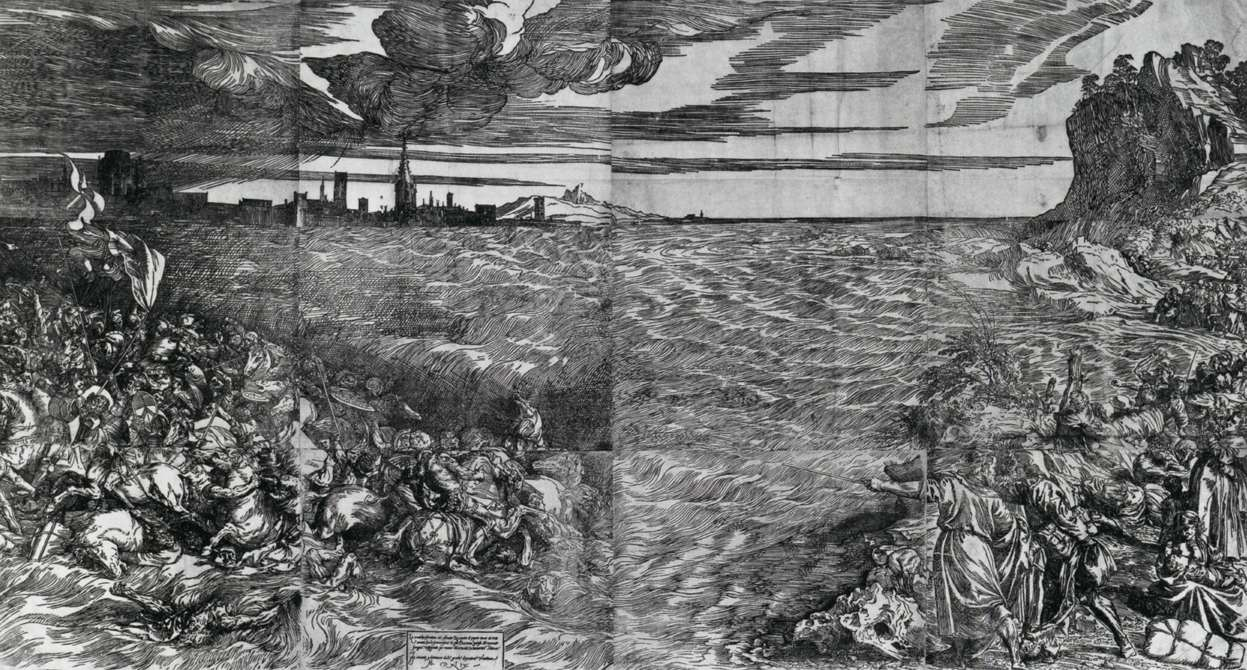
Titian – Drowning of the Pharaoh's Host in the Red Sea, 1515–1517

Albrecht Dürer – Drawing of a walrus, 1521

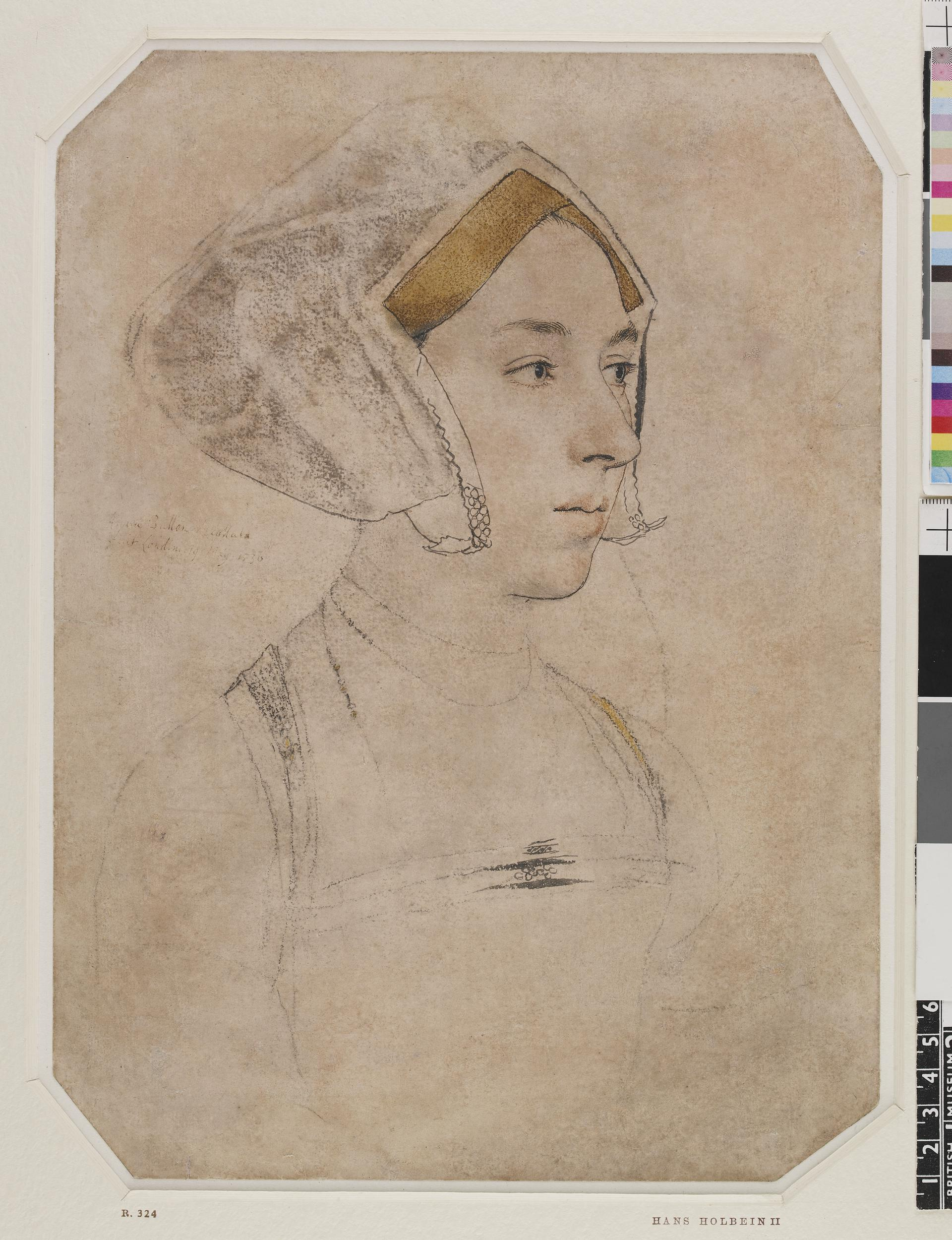
Hans Holbein the Younger – Portrait of Anne Boleyn, 1536

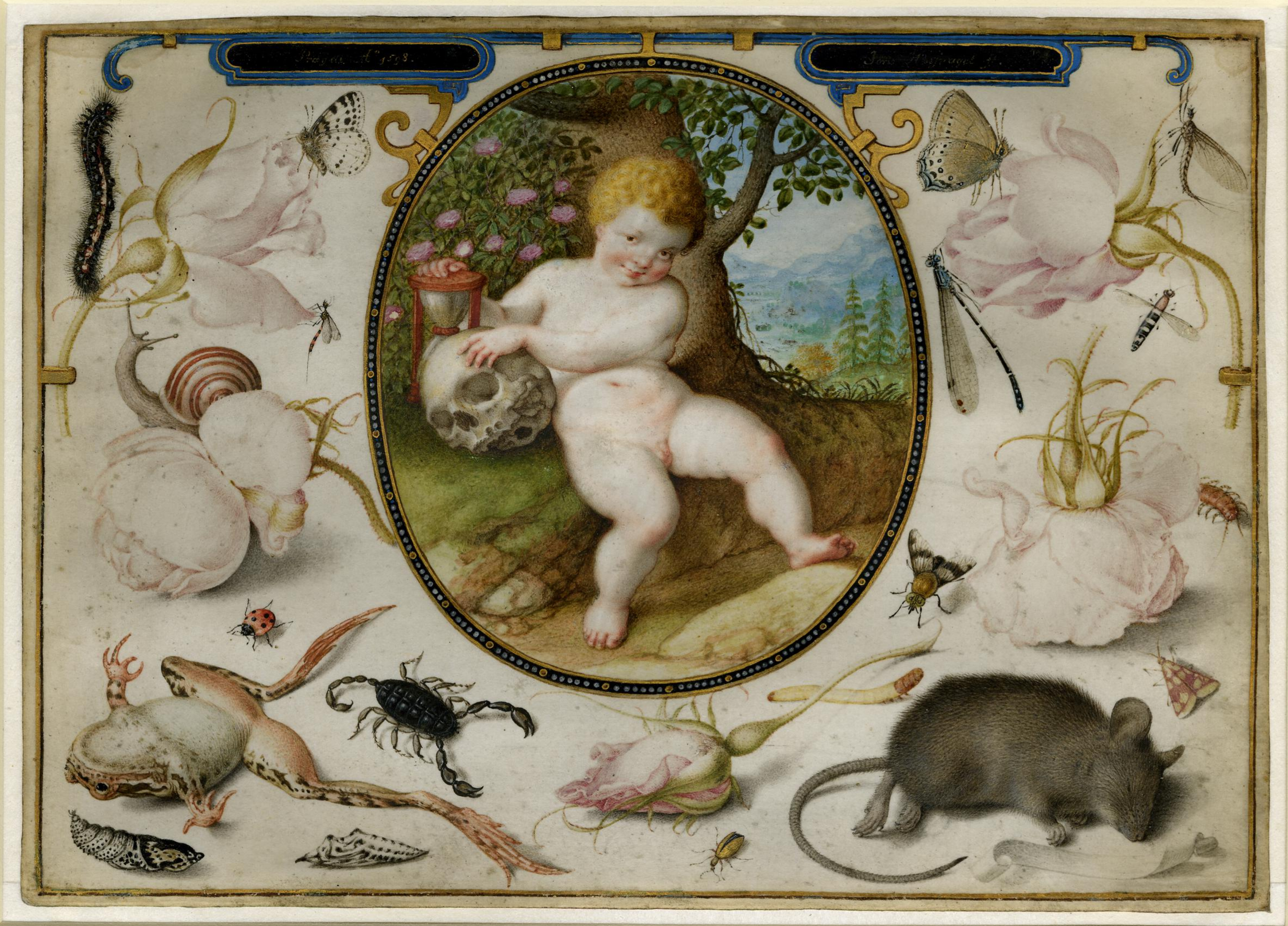
Joris Hoefnagel and Jacob Hoefnagel – Allegory on Life and Death, circa 1598

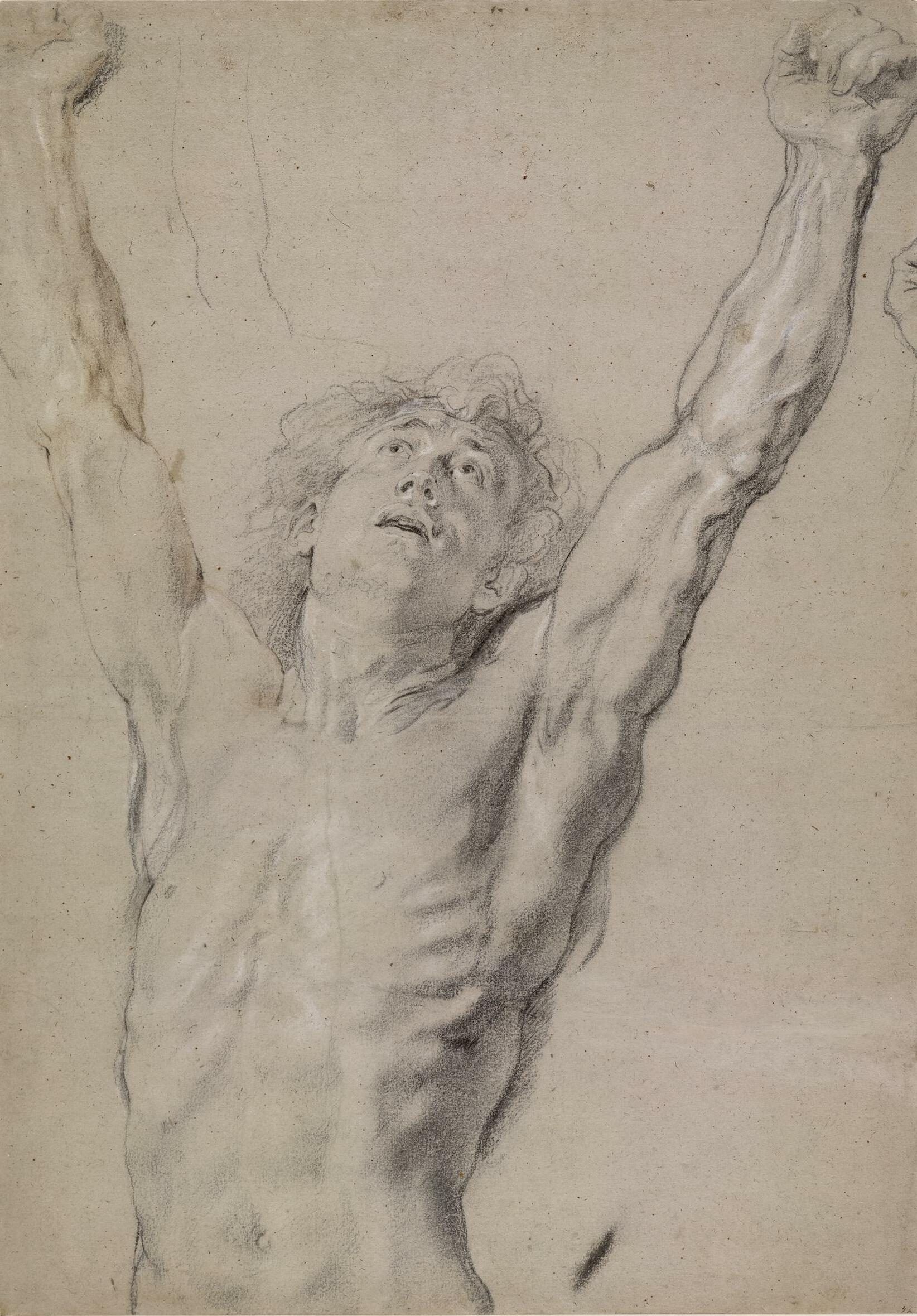
Peter Paul Rubens – Study for the figure of Christ on the Cross, 1610

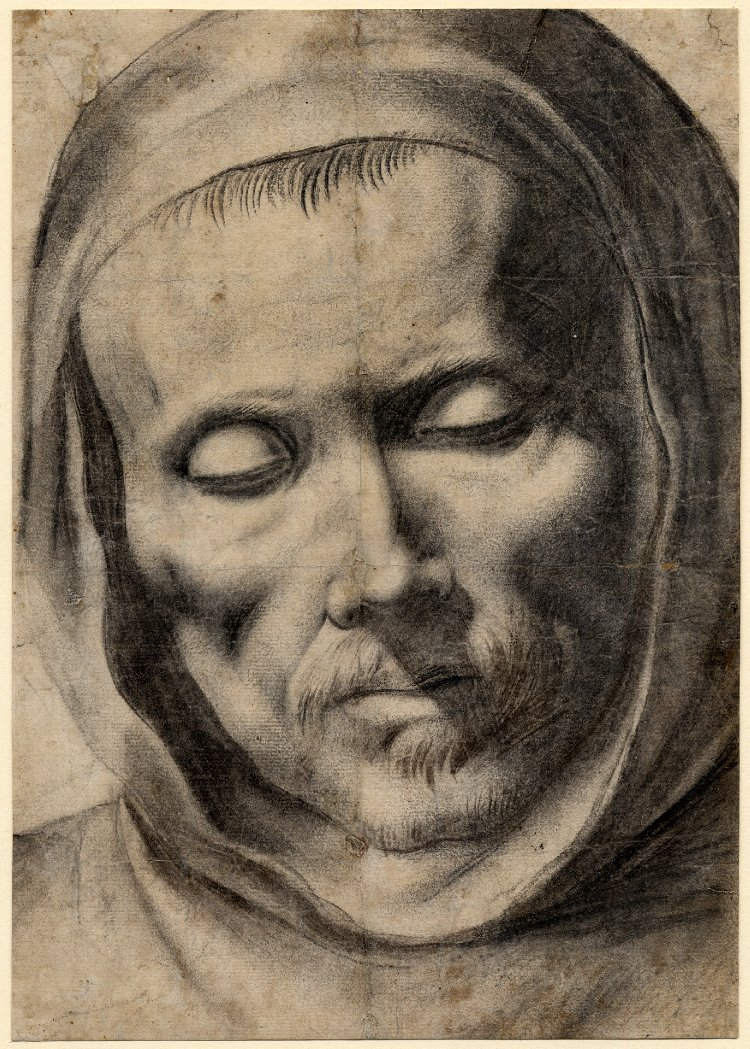
Francisco de Zurbarán – Head of a monk, 1625–1664

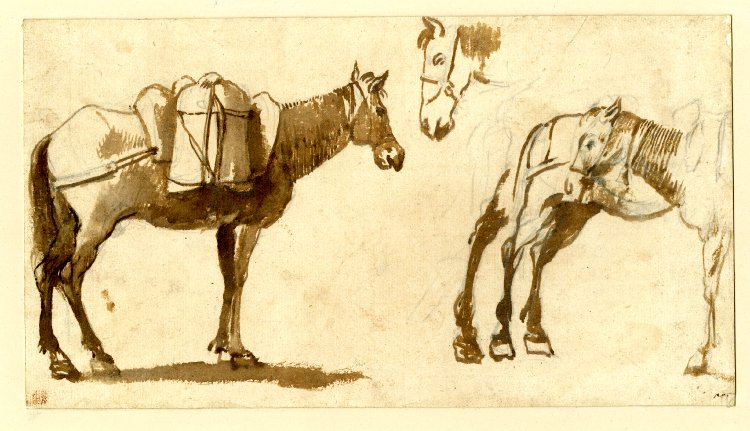
Claude Lorrain – Drawing of mules, including one full-length, 1630–1640

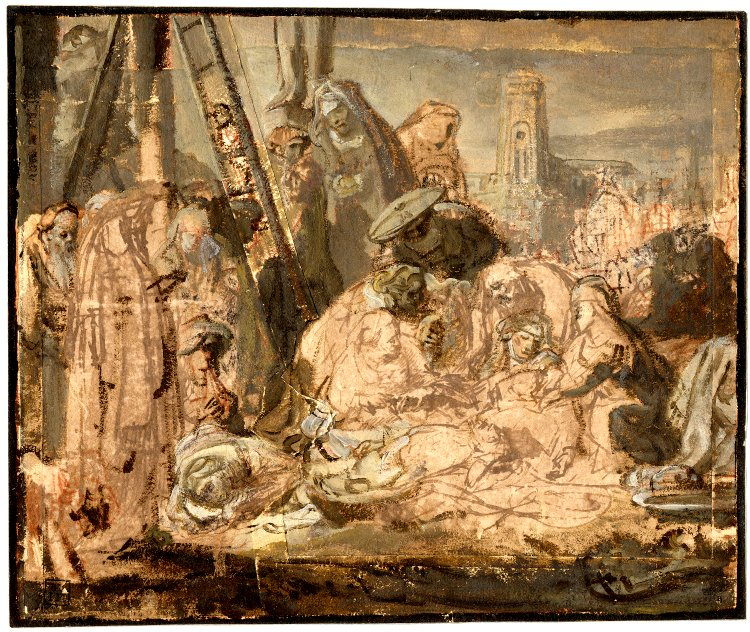
Rembrandt – The Lamentation at the Foot of the Cross, 1634–35

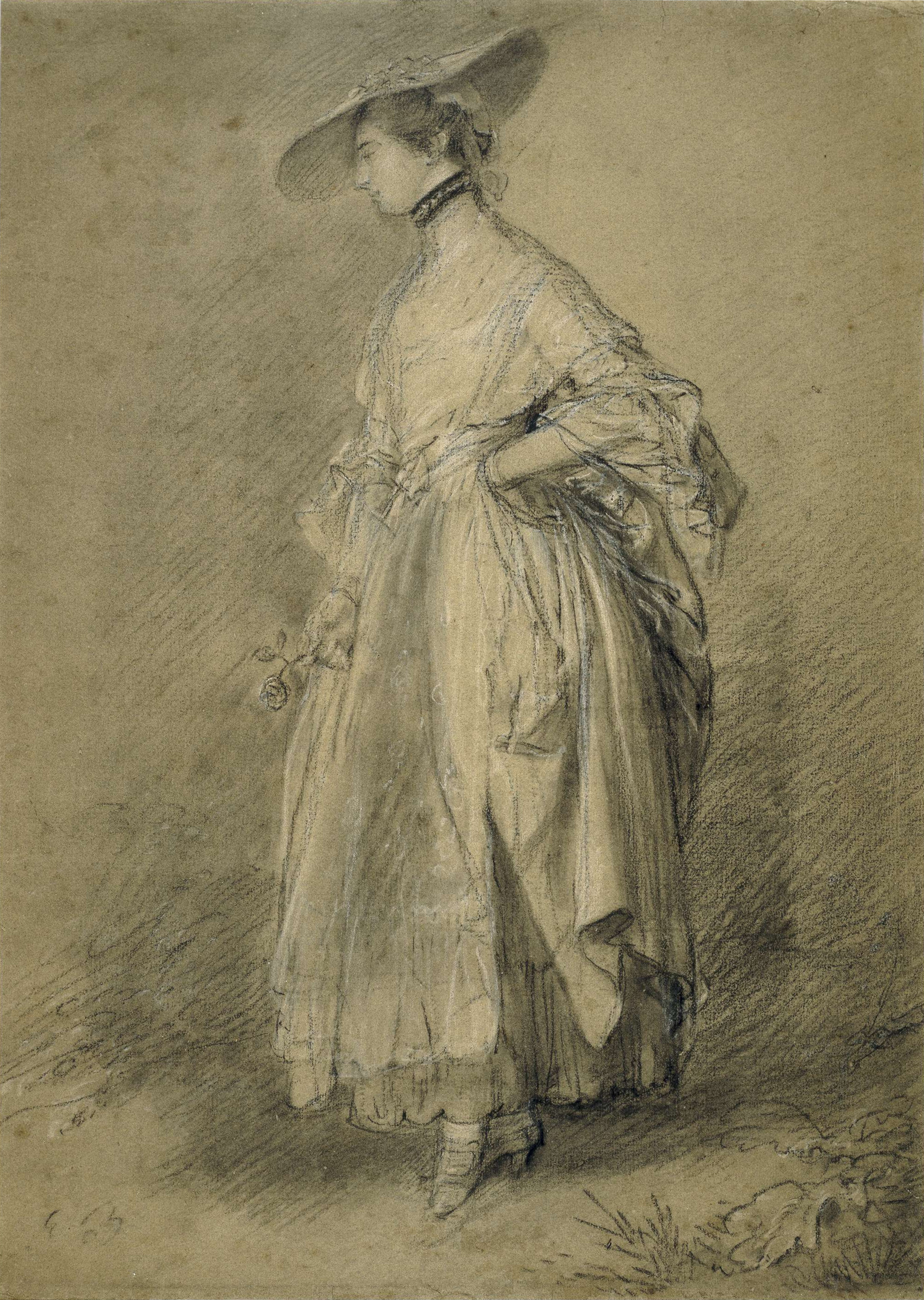
Thomas Gainsborough – Drawing of a woman with a rose, 1763–1765

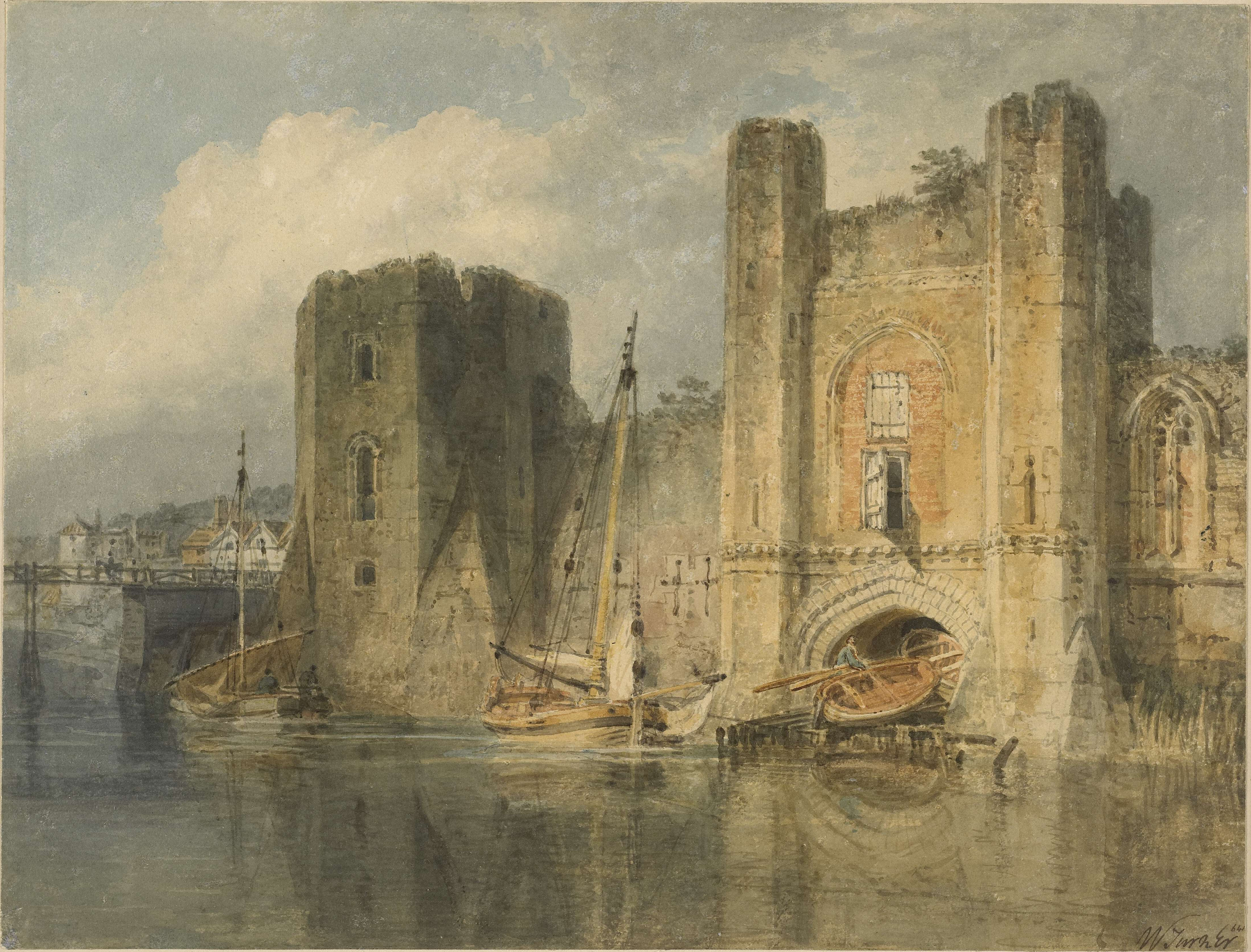
J. M. W. Turner – Watercolour of Newport Castle, 1796

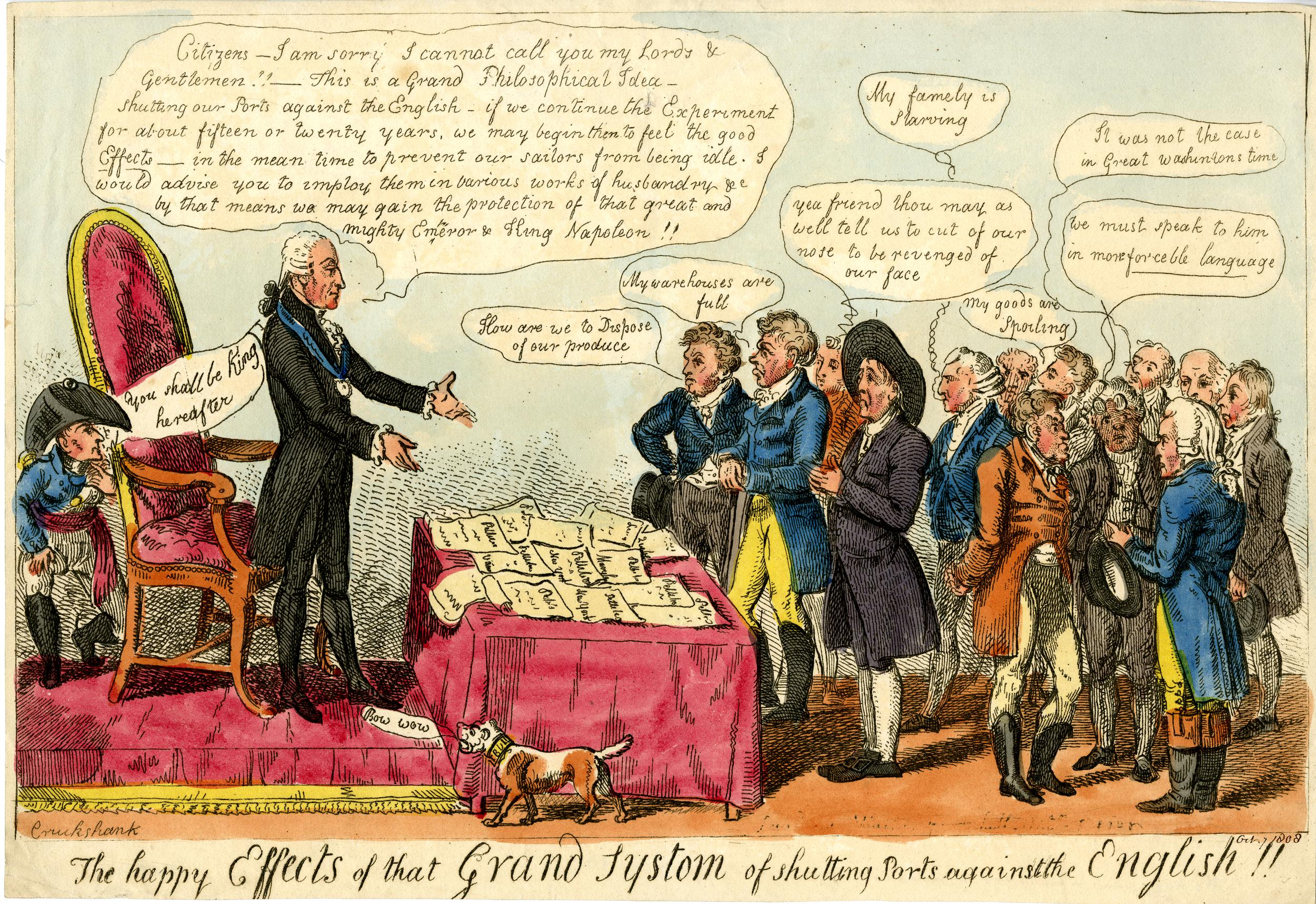
Isaac Cruikshank – 'The happy effects of that grand system of shutting ports against the English!!', 1808

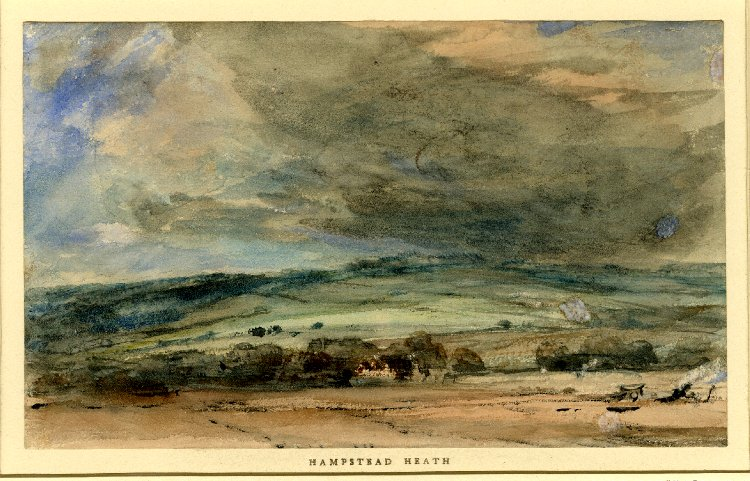
John Constable – London from Hampstead Heath in a Storm, (watercolour), 1831

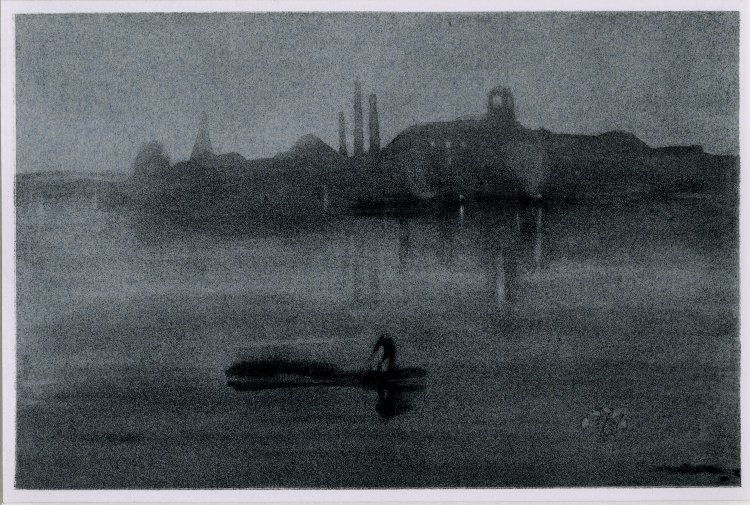
James McNeill Whistler – View of the Battersea side of Chelsea Reach, London, (lithograph), 1878

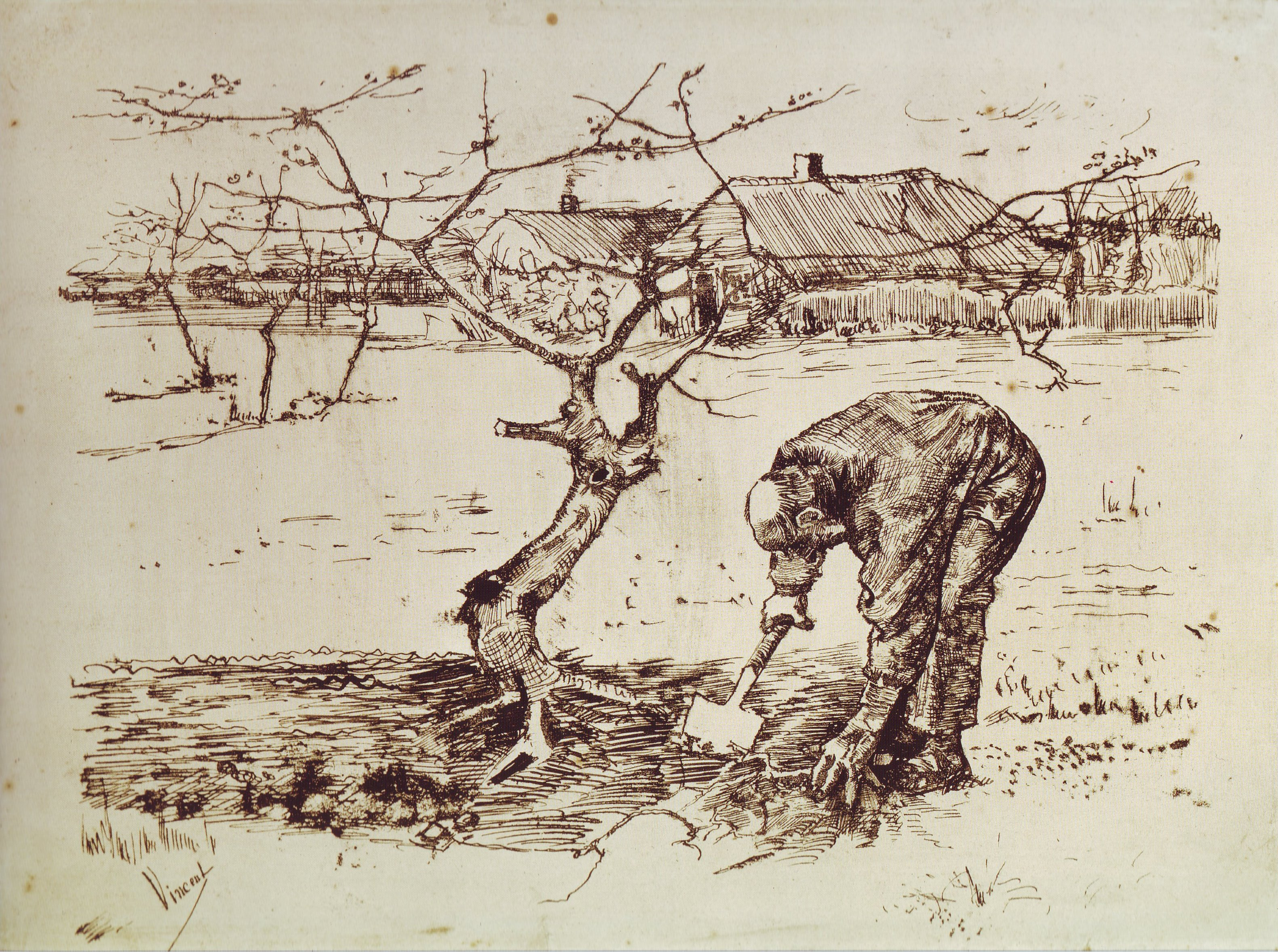
Vincent van Gogh – Man Digging in the Orchard (print), 1883

=== Department of Britain, Europe and Prehistory ===
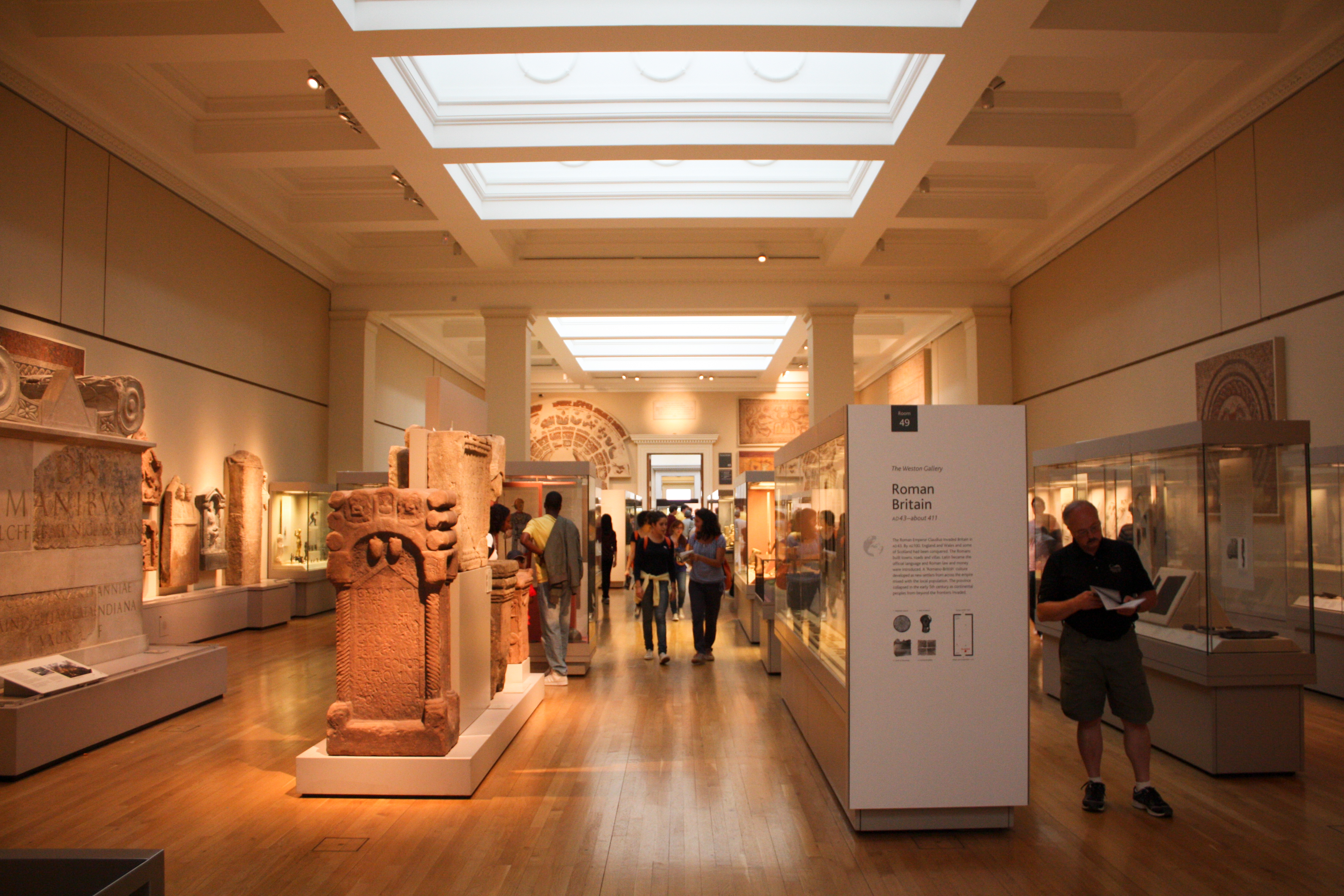
Gallery 50 – View down the Roman Britain gallery

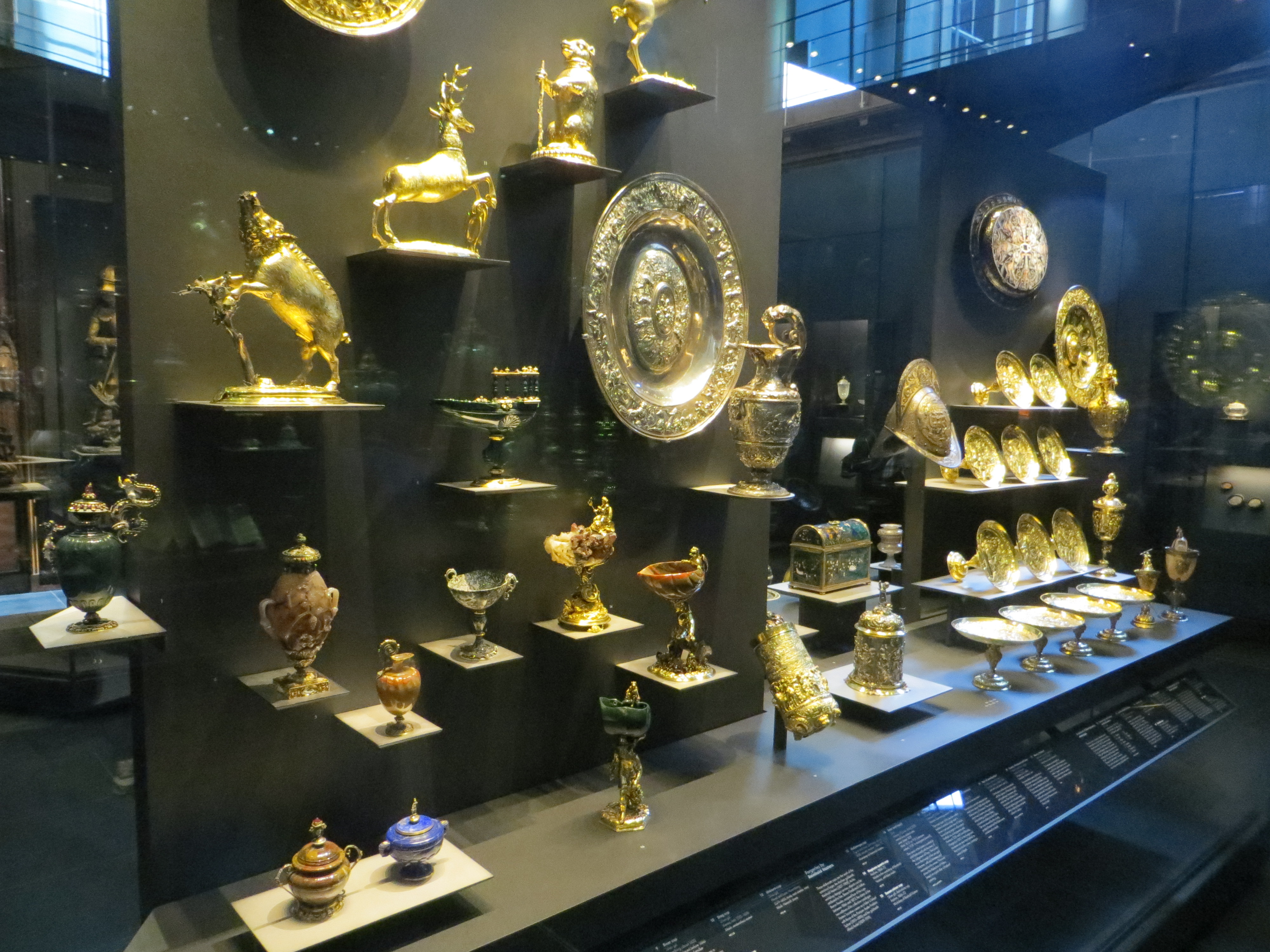
Gallery 2a – Display case of Renaissance metalware from the Waddesdon Bequest

The Department of Britain, Europe and Prehistory is responsible for collections that cover a vast expanse of time and geography. It includes some of the earliest objects made by humans in east Africa over 2 million years ago, as well as Prehistoric and neolithic objects from other parts of the world; and the art and archaeology of Europe from the earliest times to the present day. Archeological excavation of prehistoric material took off and expanded considerably in the twentieth century and the department now has literally millions of objects from the Palaeolithic and Mesolithic periods throughout the world, as well as from the Neolithic, Bronze Age and Iron Age in Europe. Stone Age material from Africa has been donated by famous archaeologists such as Louis and Mary Leakey, and Gertrude Caton–Thompson. Palaeolithic objects from the Sturge, Christy and Lartet collections include some of the earliest works of art from Europe. Many Bronze Age objects from across Europe were added during the nineteenth century, often from large collections built up by excavators and scholars such as Greenwell in Britain, Tobin and Cooke in Ireland, Lukis and de la Grancière in Brittany, Worsaae in Denmark, Siret at El Argar in Spain, and Klemm and Edelmann in Germany. A representative selection of Iron Age artefacts from Hallstatt were acquired as a result of the Evans/Lubbock excavations and from Giubiasco in Ticino through the Swiss National Museum.

In addition, the British Museum's collections covering the period AD 300 to 1100 are among the largest and most comprehensive in the world, extending from Spain to the Black Sea and from North Africa to Scandinavia; a representative selection of these has recently been redisplayed in a newly refurbished gallery. Important collections include Latvian, Norwegian, Gotlandic and Merovingian material from Johann Karl Bähr, Alfred Heneage Cocks, Sir James Curle and Philippe Delamain respectively. However, the undoubted highlight from the early mediaeval period is the magnificent items from the Sutton Hoo royal grave, generously donated to the nation by the landowner Edith Pretty. The late mediaeval collection includes a large number of seal-dies from across Europe, the most famous of which include those from the Town of Boppard in Germany, Isabella of Hainault from her tomb in Notre Dame Cathedral, Paris, Inchaffray Abbey in Scotland and Robert Fitzwalter, one of the Barons who led the revolt against King John in England. There is also a large collection of medieval signet rings, prominent among them is the gold signet ring belonging to Jean III de Grailly who fought in the Hundred Years' War, as well as those of Mary, Queen of Scots and Richard I of England. Other groups of artefacts represented in the department include the national collection of (c.100) icon paintings, most of which originate from the Byzantine Empire and Russia, and over 40 mediaeval astrolabes from across Europe and the Middle East. The department also includes the national collection of horology with one of the most wide-ranging assemblage of clocks, watches and other timepieces in Europe, with masterpieces from every period in the development of time-keeping. Choice horological pieces came from the Morgan and Ilbert collections. The department is also responsible for the curation of Romano-British objects – the museum has by far the most extensive such collection in Britain and one of the most representative regional collections in Europe outside Italy. It is particularly famous for the large number of late Roman silver treasures, many of which were found in East Anglia, the most important of which is the Mildenhall Treasure. The museum purchased many Roman-British objects from the antiquarian Charles Roach Smith in 1856. These quickly formed the nucleus of the collection. The department also includes ethnographic material from across Europe including a collection of Bulgarian costumes and shadow puppets from Greece and Turkey. A particular highlight are the three Sámi drums from northern Sweden of which only about 70 are extant.

Objects from the Department of Britain, Europe and Prehistory are mostly found on the upper floor of the museum, with a suite of galleries numbered from 38 to 51. Most of the collection is stored in its archive facilities, where it is available for research and study.

Highlights of the collections include:

Stone Age (c. 3.4 million years BC – c. 2000 BC)

- Palaeolithic material from across Africa, particularly Olduvai, Kalambo Falls, Olorgesailie and Cape Flats, (1.8 million BC onwards)
- One of the 11 leaf-shaped points found near Volgu, Saône-et-Loire, France and estimated to be 16,000 years old
- Ice Age art from France including the Wolverine pendant of Les Eyzies, Montastruc decorated stone and Baton fragment, (c. 12–11,000 BC)
- Ice Age art from Britain including the decorated jaw from Kendrick and Robin Hood Cave Horse, (11,500–10,000 BC)
- Rare mesolithic artefacts from the site of Star Carr in Yorkshire, northern England, (8770–8460 BC)
- Terracotta figurine from Vinča, Serbia, (5200–4900 BC)
- Callaïs bead jewellery from Lannec-er-Ro'h, intact schist bracelet from Le Lizo, Carnac and triangular pendant from Mané-er-Hroëk, Morbihan, Brittany, western France, (5000–4300 BC)
- Mother Goddess figurine from Campo-Fiorello near Grossa, southern Corsica (c.4500 BC)
- Polished jade axe produced in the Italian Alps and found in Canterbury, Kent, southeast England, (4500–4000 BC)
- Section of the Sweet Track, an ancient timber causeway from the Somerset Levels, England, (3807/6 BC)
- Small collection of Neolithic finds including a necklace of flat bone beads from Skara Brae, Orkneys, northern Scotland, (3180–2500 BC)
- Representative sample of artefacts (sherds, vessels, etc.) from the megalithic site of Tarxien, Malta, (3150–2500 BC)
- A number of carved stone balls from Scotland, Ireland and northern England, (3200–2500 BC)
- The three Folkton Drums, made from chalk and found in Yorkshire, northern England, (2600–2100 BC)

Bronze Age (c. 3300 BC – c. 600 BC)

- Jet beaded necklace from Melfort in Argyll, Scotland, (c. 3000 BC)
- Gold lunula from Blessington, Ireland, one of twelve from Ireland, England, LLanllyfini, Wales and Gwithian, Cornwall, (2400–2000 BC)
- Early Bronze Age hoards from Barnack, Driffield, Sewell and Snowshill in England, Arraiolos and Vendas Novas in Iberia and Auvernier, Biecz and Neunheilingen in central Europe (2280–1500 BC)
- Mold cape, unique cape made of gold sheet from Mold, Wales (1900–1600 BC)
- Contents of the Rillaton Barrow including a gold cup, and the related Ringlemere Cup, England, (1700–1500 BC)
- Bronze Age hoards from Forró, Paks-Dunaföldvár, Szőny and Zsujta in Hungary, (1600–1000 BC)
- Large ceremonial swords or dirks from Oxborough and Beaune, western Europe, (1450–1300 BC)
- Eight bronze shields including those from Moel Hebog and Rhyd-y-gors, Wales and Athenry, County Galway, Ireland, (12th–10th centuries BC)
- Gold hoards from Morvah and Towednack in Cornwall, Milton Keynes in Buckinghamshire and Mooghaun in Ireland, (1150–750 BC)
- Gold bowl with intricate repoussé decoration from Leer, Lower Saxony, northern Germany, (1100–800 BC)
- Dunaverney flesh-hook found near Ballymoney, Northern Ireland and part of the Dowris Hoard from County Offaly, Ireland, (1050–900 BC & 900–600 BC)
- Late Bronze Age gold hoards from Abia de la Obispalía and Mérida, Spain and an intricate gold collar from Sintra, Portugal, (10th–8th centuries BC)
- Shropshire bulla, gold pendant decorated with intricately carved geometric designs, (1000–750 BC)
- Part of a copper alloy lur from Årslev on the island of Funen, Denmark, one of only about 40 extant and the Dunmanway Horn from County Cork, Ireland (900–750 BC)
- Gold bowl with embossed ornament and fluted wire handle from Angyalföld, Budapest, Hungary, (800–600 BC)

Iron Age (c. 600 BC – c. 1st century AD)

- Basse Yutz Flagons, a pair of bronze drinking vessels from Moselle, eastern France, (5th century BC)
- Morel collection of La Tène material from eastern France, including the Somme-Bionne chariot burial and the Prunay Vase, (450–300BC)
- Important finds from the River Thames including the Battersea, Chertsey and Wandsworth shields and Waterloo Helmet, as well as the Witham Shield from Lincolnshire, eastern England, (350–50 BC)
- Bronze scabbard with La Tène engraved decoration, found at Lisnacrogher bog, County Antrim, Northern Ireland, (300–200 BC)
- Pair of gold collars called the Orense Torcs from northwest Spain, (300–150 BC)
- Arras culture items from chariot burials in the Lady's Barrow near Market Weighton and Wetwang Slack, Yorkshire, (300 BC – 100 BC)
- Other gold neck collars including the Ipswich Hoard and the Sedgeford Torc, England, (200–50 BC)
- Winchester Hoard of gold jewellery from southern England and the Great Torc from Snettisham in Norfolk, East Anglia, (100 BC)
- Eight out of about thirty extant intact Celtic bronze mirrors with La Tène decoration including those from Aston, Chettle, Desborough, Holcombe and St Keverne in England, (100 BC – 100 AD)
- Cordoba and Arcillera Treasures, two silver Celtic hoards from Spain, (100–20 BC)
- Grave find of ornately decorated bronze bucket with human shaped handles, a pan, jug, three brooches and at least four pottery vessels from Aylesford, Kent, (75 BC – 25 BC)
- Lindow Man found by accident in a peat bog in Cheshire, England, (1st century AD)
- Stanwick Hoard of horse and chariot fittings and the Meyrick Helmet, northern England, (1st century AD)
- La Tène silver hinged brooch from Székesfehérvár, Hungary, (1–100 AD)
- Lochar Moss Torc and two pairs of massive bronze armlets from Muthill and Strathdon, Scotland, (50–200 AD)

Romano-British (43 AD – 410 AD)

- Tombstone of Roman procurator Gaius Julius Alpinus Classicianus from London, (1st century)
- Ribbed glass bowl found in a grave at Radnage, Buckinghamshire, (1st century)
- Large milestone marker with inscription from the reign of the emperor Hadrian from Llanfairfechan, Gwynedd in North Wales, (120–121 AD)
- Ribchester, Guisborough and Witcham helmets once worn by Roman cavalry in Britain, (1st–2nd centuries)
- Elaborate gold bracelets and ring found near Rhayader, central Wales, (1st–2nd centuries)
- Hoard of gold jewellery found at Dolaucothi mine in Carmarthenshire, Wales, (1st–2nd centuries)
- Bronze heads of the Roman emperors Hadrian and Nero, found in London and Suffolk, (1st–2nd centuries)
- Vindolanda Tablets, important historical documents found near Hadrian's Wall in Northumberland, (1st–2nd centuries)
- Head of Mercury from Roman-Celtic Temple at Uley, Gloucestershire and limestone head from Towcester, Northamptonshire (2nd–4th centuries)
- Wall-paintings and sculptures from the Roman Villa at Lullingstone, Kent, south east England, 1st–4th centuries)
- Capheaton and Backworth treasures, remnants of two important hoards from northern England, (2nd–3rd centuries)
- Stony Stratford Hoard of copper headdresses, fibulae and silver votive plaques, central England, (3rd century)
- Square silver dish from Mileham in Norfolk, (4th century)
- Gold jewellery deposited at the site of Newgrange, Ireland, (4th century)
- Thetford Hoard, late Roman jewellery from eastern England, (4th century)

Early Mediaeval (c. 4th century AD – c. 1000 AD)

- One of five Largitio silver dishes of the emperor Licinius found at Niš, Serbia and a hexagonal gold coin-set pendant of Constantine the Great, (Early 4th century AD)
- Two wooden ship figureheads dredged from the River Scheldt at Moerzeke and Appels, Belgium, (4th–6th centuries)
- Part of the Asyut, Domagnano, Artres, Sutri, Bergamo and Belluno Treasures, (4th–7th centuries)
- Lycurgus Cup, a unique figurative glass cage cup, and the Byzantine Archangel ivory panel, (4th–6th centuries)
- Three large Ogham stones from the Roofs More Rath, County Cork, Ireland, (5th–7th centuries)
- The Sutton Hoo treasure, Taplow burial and Crundale grave objects with some of the greatest finds from the early Middle Ages in Europe, England, (6th–7th centuries)
- One of the Burghead Bulls, Pictish stone relief from northeast Scotland, (7th–8th centuries)
- Three Viking hoards from Norway known as the Lilleberge Viking Burial, Tromsø Burial, and Villa Farm barrow burial (in Vestnes Municipality) plus the Ardvouray, Ballaquayle, Cuerdale, Goldsborough and Vale of York hoards from Britain, (7th–10th centuries)
- Irish reliquaries such as the Kells Crozier, Bell Shrine of St. Cuileáin and St Conall Cael's Shrine from Inishkeel, (7th–11th centuries)
- Early Anglo Saxon Franks Casket, a unique ivory container from northern England, (8th century)
- T-shaped Carolingian antler container with carved geometric interlace and zigzag decoration, found near Grüneck Castle, Ilanz, Switzerland, (8th–9th centuries)
- A number of luxurious penannular brooches such as the Londesborough Brooch, Breadalbane Brooch and those from the Penrith Hoard, British Isles, (8th–9th centuries)
- Three of the twenty extant Carolingian crystal intaglios including the Lothair Crystal, the Metz engraved gem with crucifixion and Saint-Denis Crystal, central Europe, (9th century)
- Anglo-Saxon Fuller and Strickland Brooches with their complex, niello-inlaid design, England, (9th century)
- One of the Magdeburg Ivories from a set of 16 surviving ivory panels illustrating episodes of the Life of Jesus, Magdeburg, Germany, (968 AD)
- Seax of Beagnoth, iron sword with long Anglo-Saxon Runic inscription, London, England, (10th century)

Mediaeval (c. 1000 AD – c. 1500 AD)

- A number of mediaeval ivory panels including the Borradaile, Wernher and John Grandisson Triptychs, (10th–14th centuries)
- Several elephant ivory horns including the Borradaile Horn, Clephane Horn and Savernake Horn, (11th–12th centuries)
- The famous Lewis chessmen found in the Outer Hebrides, Scotland, (12th century)
- Reliquary of St. Eustace from the treasury of Basel Munster, Switzerland and fragments of a rare Romanesque crucifix from South Cerney, England, (12th century)
- Armenian stone-cross or Khachkar from the Noratus cemetery in Armenia, (1225 AD)
- Items from the tomb of Henry VI, Holy Roman Emperor at Palermo Cathedral, Sicily, including his mitre, silk pall and shoe, (late 12th century)
- The unique Warwick Castle Citole, an early form of guitar, central England, (1280–1330)
- Set of 10 wooden door panels engraved with Christian scenes from the Hanging Church in Old Cairo, Egypt, (1300)
- Asante Jug, mysteriously found at the Asante Court in the late 19th century, England, (1390–1400)
- Holy Thorn Reliquary bequeathed by Ferdinand de Rothschild as part of the Waddesdon Bequest, Paris, France, (14th century)
- Dunstable Swan Jewel, a gold and enamel brooch in the form of a swan, England, (14th century)
- A silver astrolabe quadrant from Canterbury, southeastern England, (14th century)
- Chalcis treasure of jewellery, dress accessories and silver plate from the island of Euboea, Greece, (14th–15th centuries)
- Magnificent cups made from precious metal such as the Royal Gold Cup and the Lacock Cup, western Europe, (14th–15th centuries)
- Complete church altar set from Medina de Pomar near Burgos, Spain (1455 AD)

Renaissance to Modern (c. 1500 AD – present)

- Tudor Heart Pendant, gold jewel associated with the marriage of King Henry VIII and Catherine of Aragon, Warwickshire, England (early 16th century)
- Two luxurious silver brooches set with precious stones from Glen Lyon and Lochbuie, Scotland (early 16th century)
- Intricately decorated parade shield made by Giorgio Ghisi from Mantua, Italy, (1554 AD)
- The Armada Service, 26 silver dishes found in Devon, south west England, (late 16th to early 17th centuries)
- Early Renaissance Lyte Jewel, presented to Thomas Lyte of Lytes Cary, Somerset by King James I of England, (1610)
- Huguenot silver from the Peter Wilding bequest, England, (18th century)
- Pair of so-called Cleopatra Vases from the Chelsea porcelain factory, London, England, (1763)
- Jaspar ware vase known as the Pegasus Vase made by Josiah Wedgwood, England, (1786)
- Two of Charles Darwin's chronometers used on the voyage of HMS Beagle, (1795–1805)
- The Hull Grundy Gift of jewellery, Europe and North America, (19th century)
- Oak clock with mother-of-pearl engraving designed by Charles Rennie Mackintosh, (1919)
- Silver tea-infuser MT 49 designed by Marianne Brandt from the Bauhaus art school, Germany, (1924)
- The Rosetta Vase, earthenware pottery vase designed by the contemporary British artist Grayson Perry, (2011)

The many hoards of treasure include those of Esquiline, Carthage, First Cyprus, Hockwold, Hoxne, Lampsacus, Mildenhall, Vale of York and Water Newton, (4th–10th centuries AD)

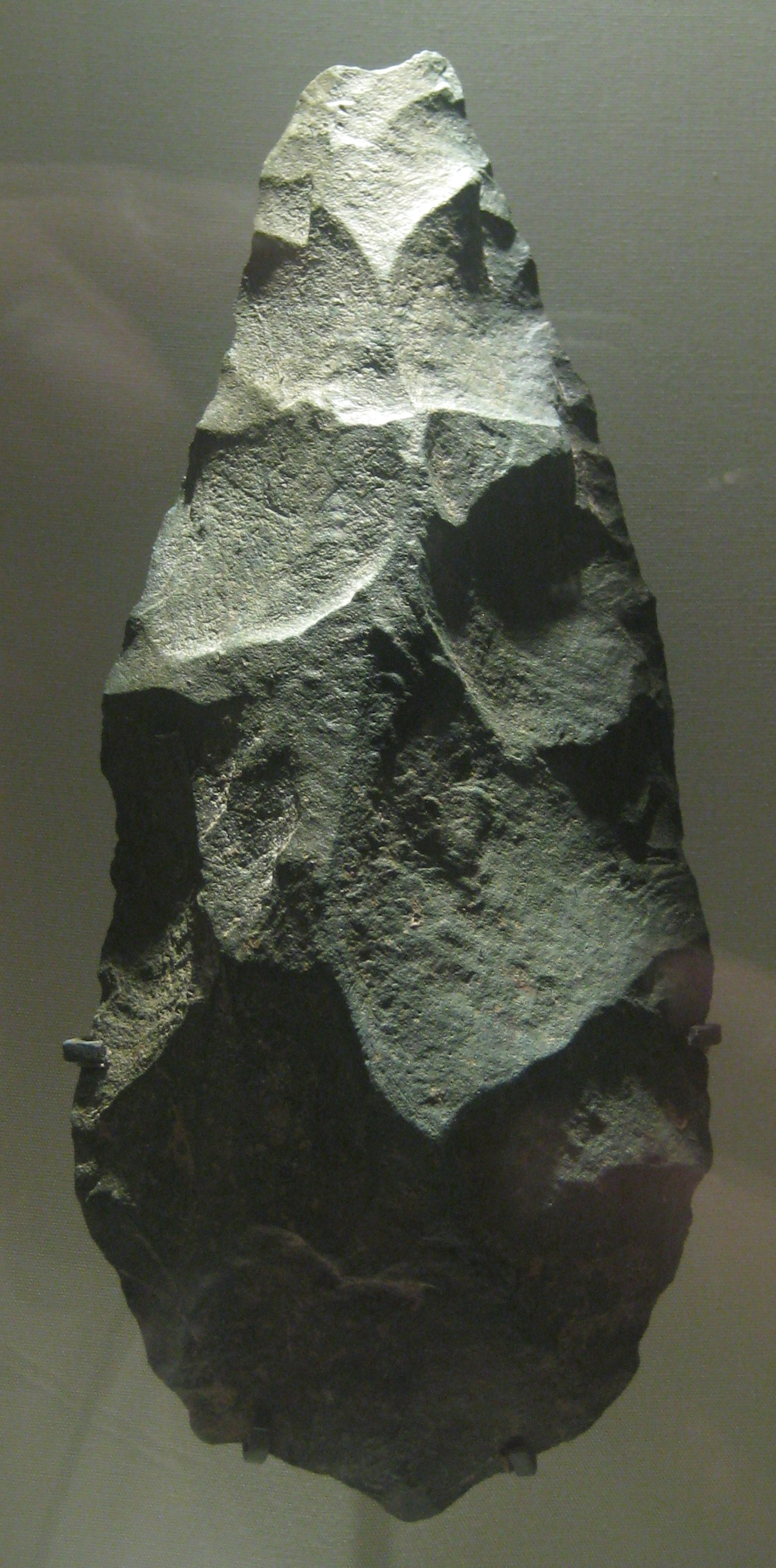
Room 2 – Handaxe, Lower Palaeolithic, Olduvai Gorge, Tanzania, c. 1.2 million years BC

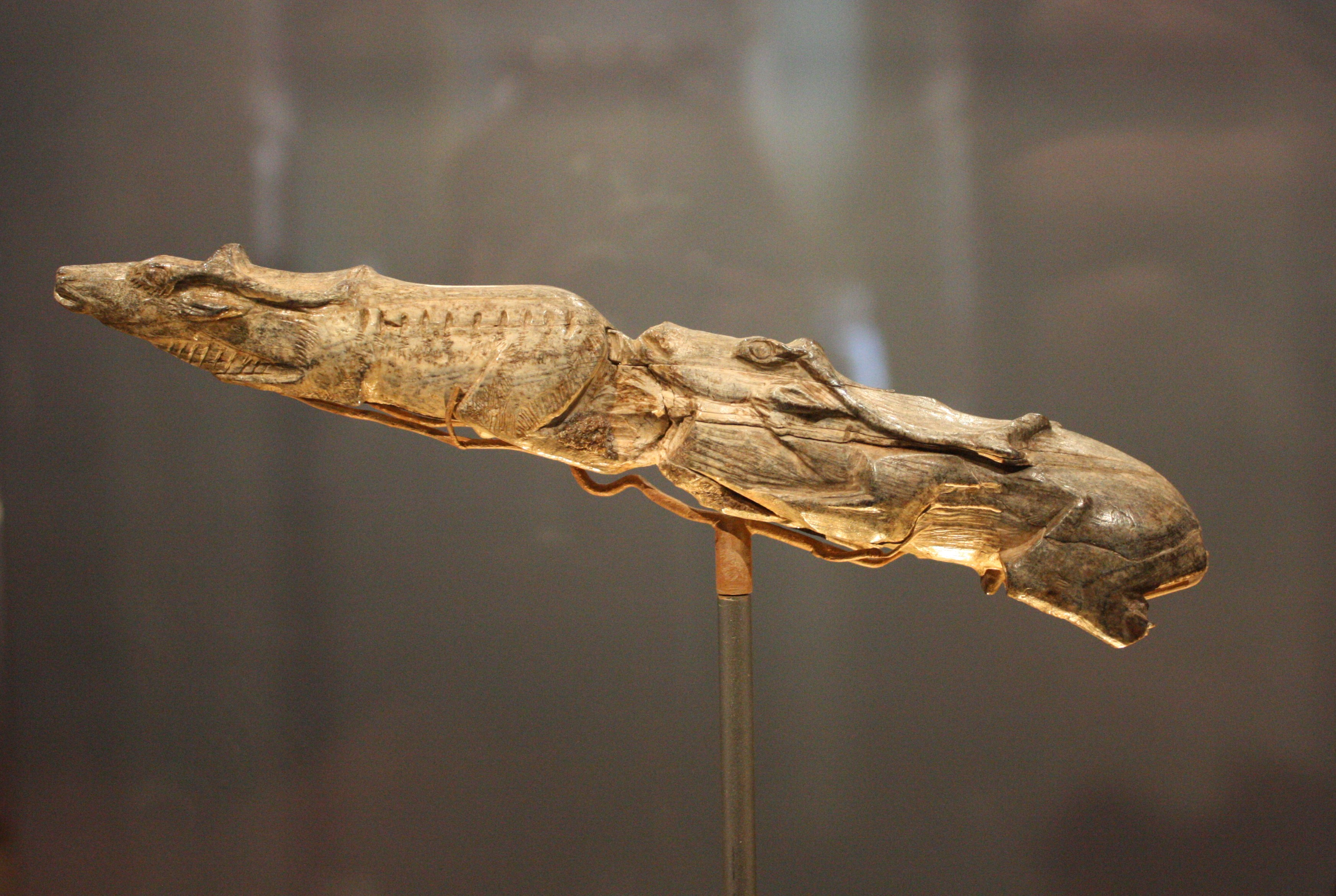
Room 3 – Swimming Reindeer carving, France, c. 13,000 years BC

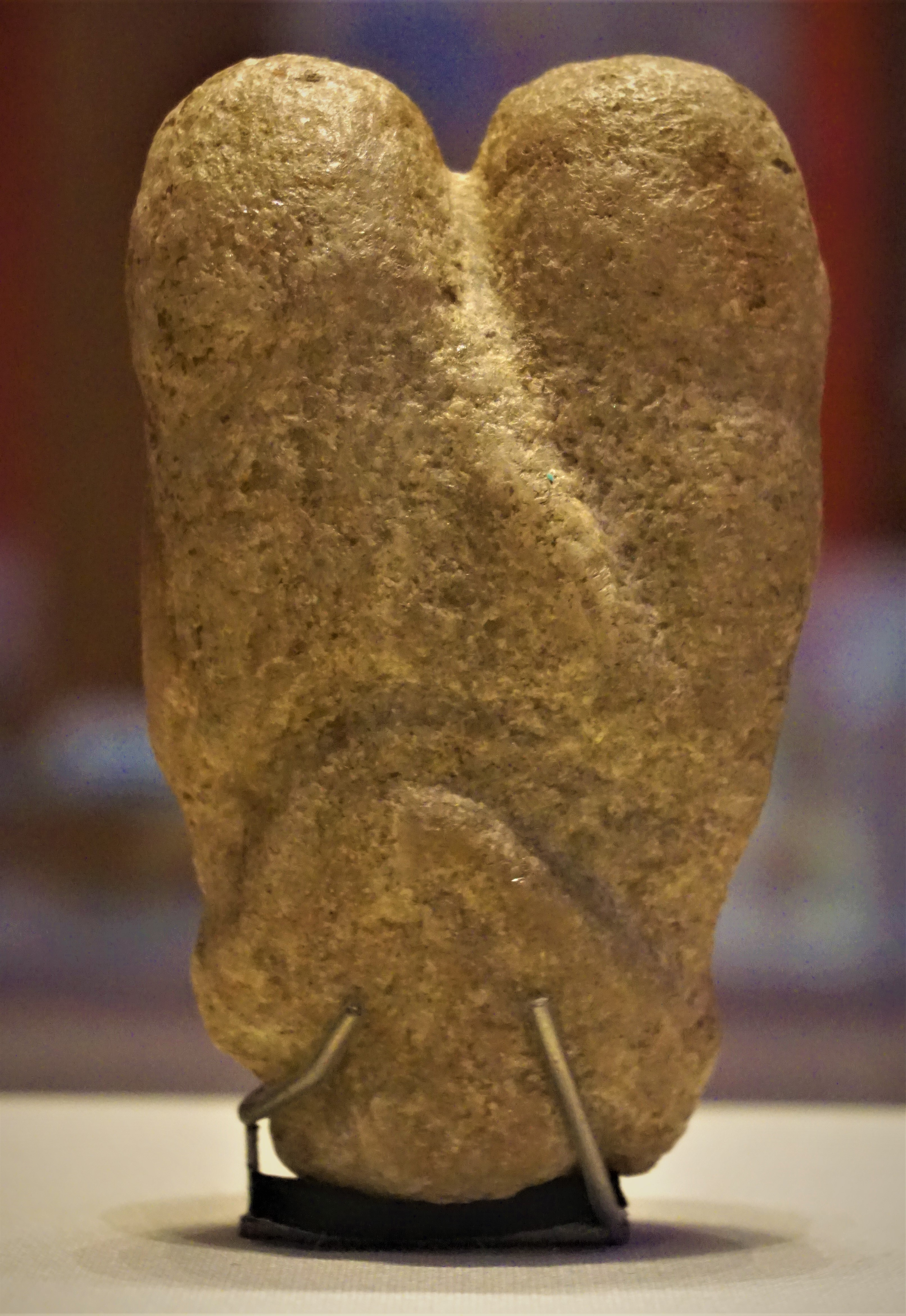
Room 2 – Ain Sakhri lovers, from the cave of Ain Sakhri, near Bethlehem, c. 9000 BC

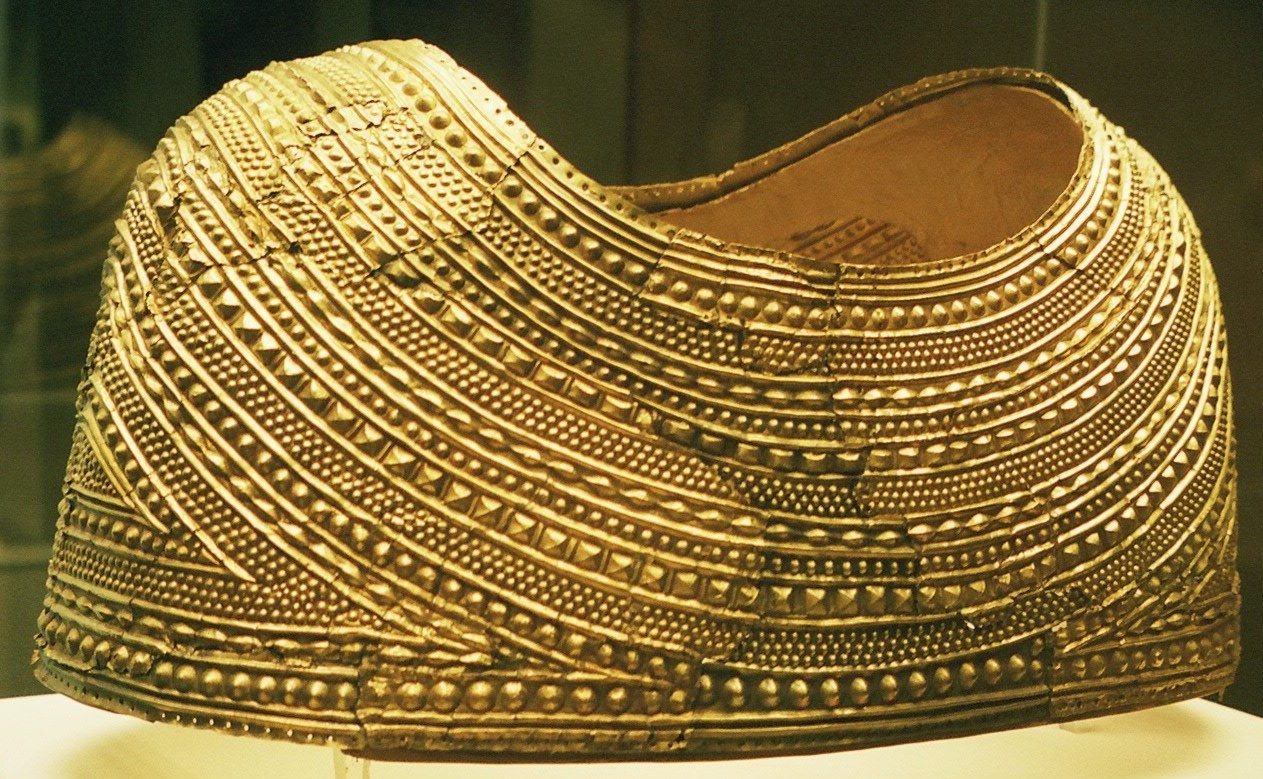
Room 51 – Mold gold cape, North Wales, Bronze Age, c. 1900–1600 BC

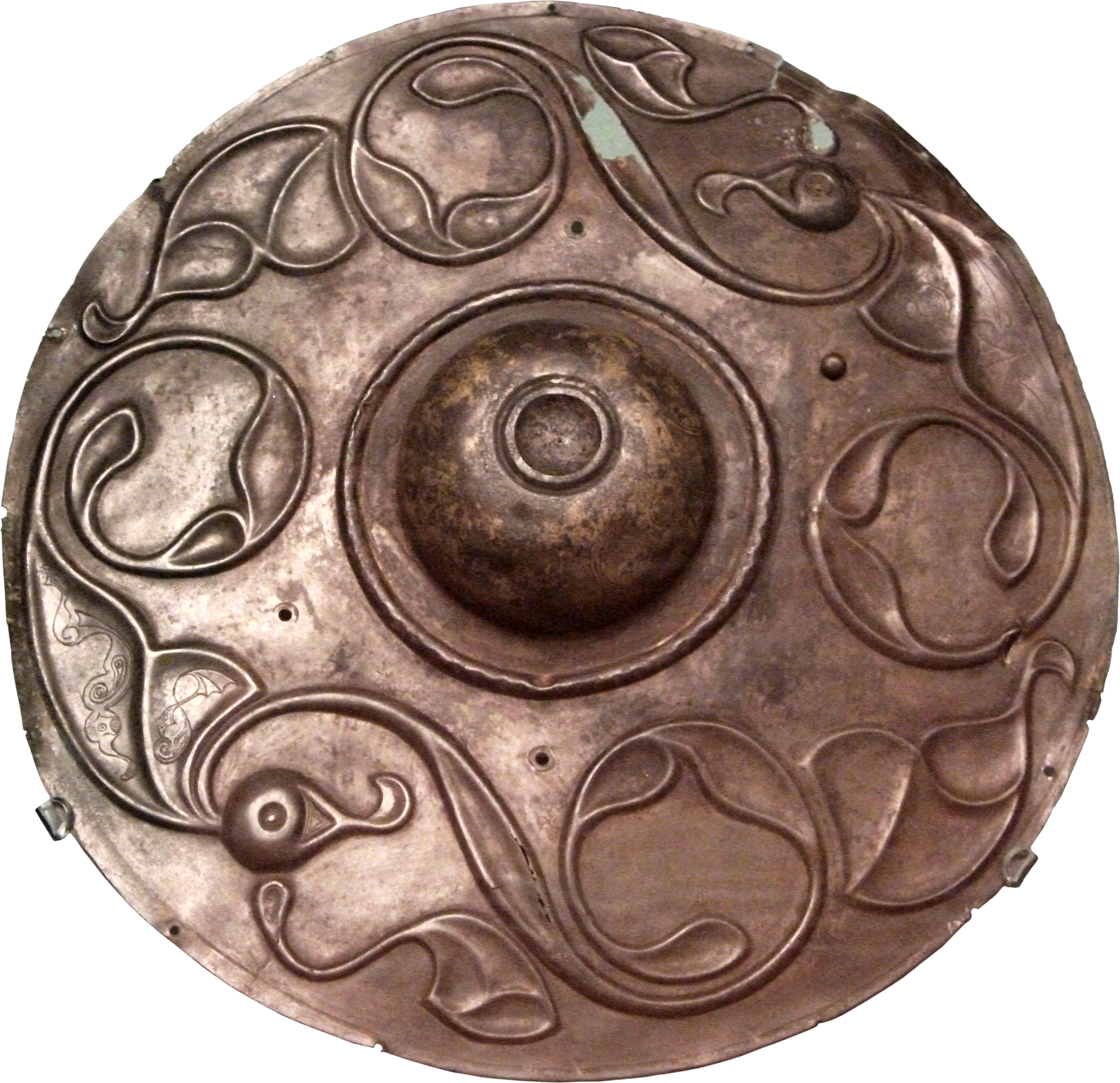
Room 50 – Wandsworth Shield, Iron Age shield boss in La Tène style, England, 2nd century BC

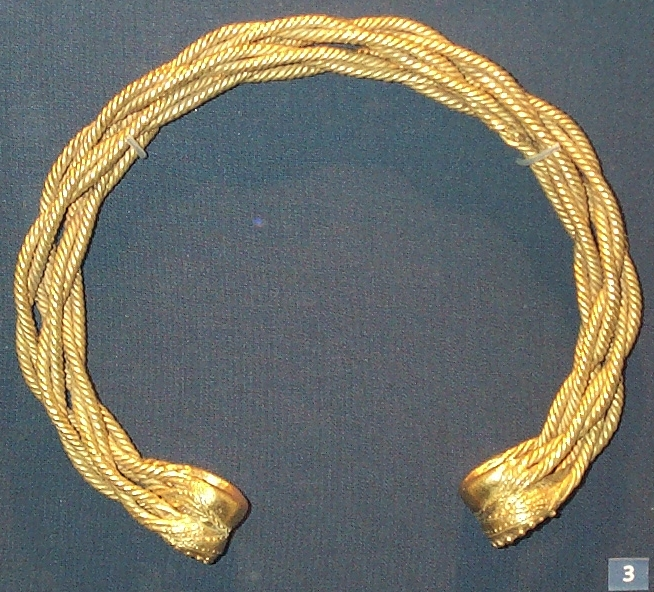
Room 50 – Gold torc found in Needwood Forest, central England, 75 BC

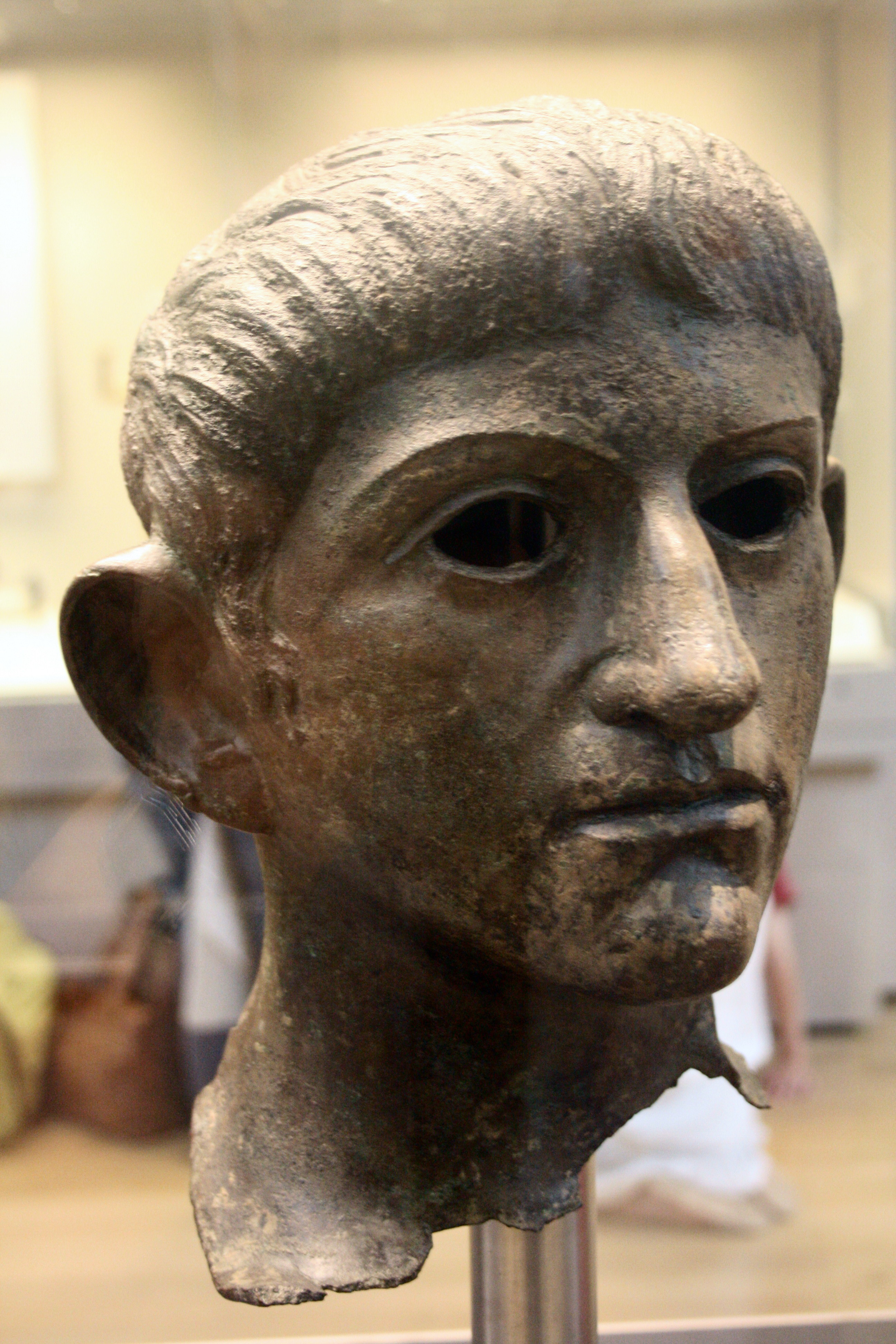
Room 49 – Bronze head of a Roman emperor, Claudius or Nero, from Rendham in Suffolk, eastern England, 1st century AD

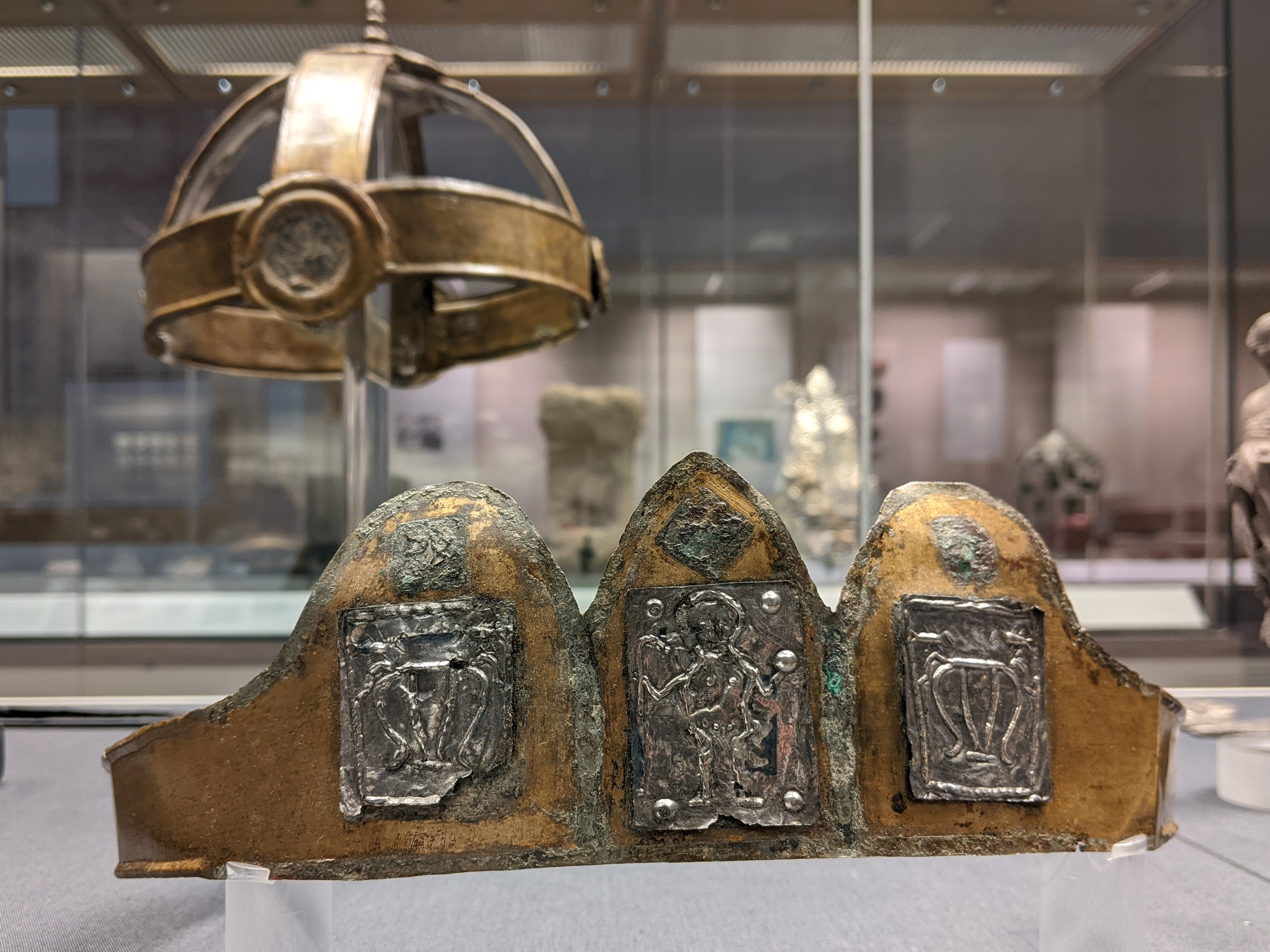
Room 49 – Romano-British crown and diadem found in Hockwold cum Wilton, England 1st century AD

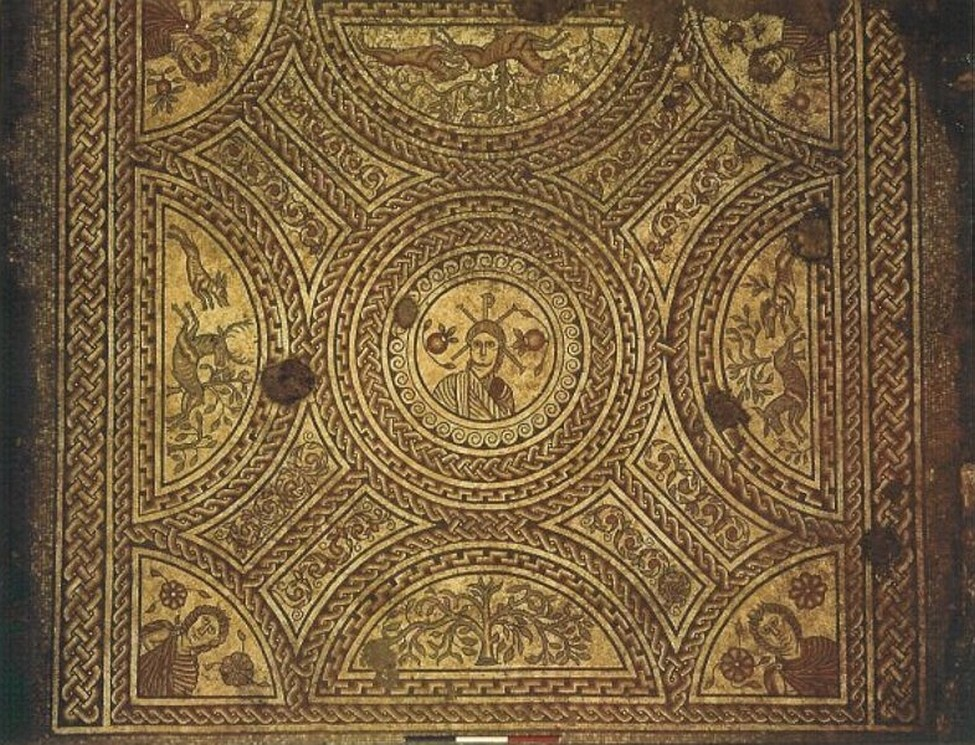
Room 49 – Hinton St Mary Mosaic with face of Christ in the centre, from Dorset, southern England, 4th century AD

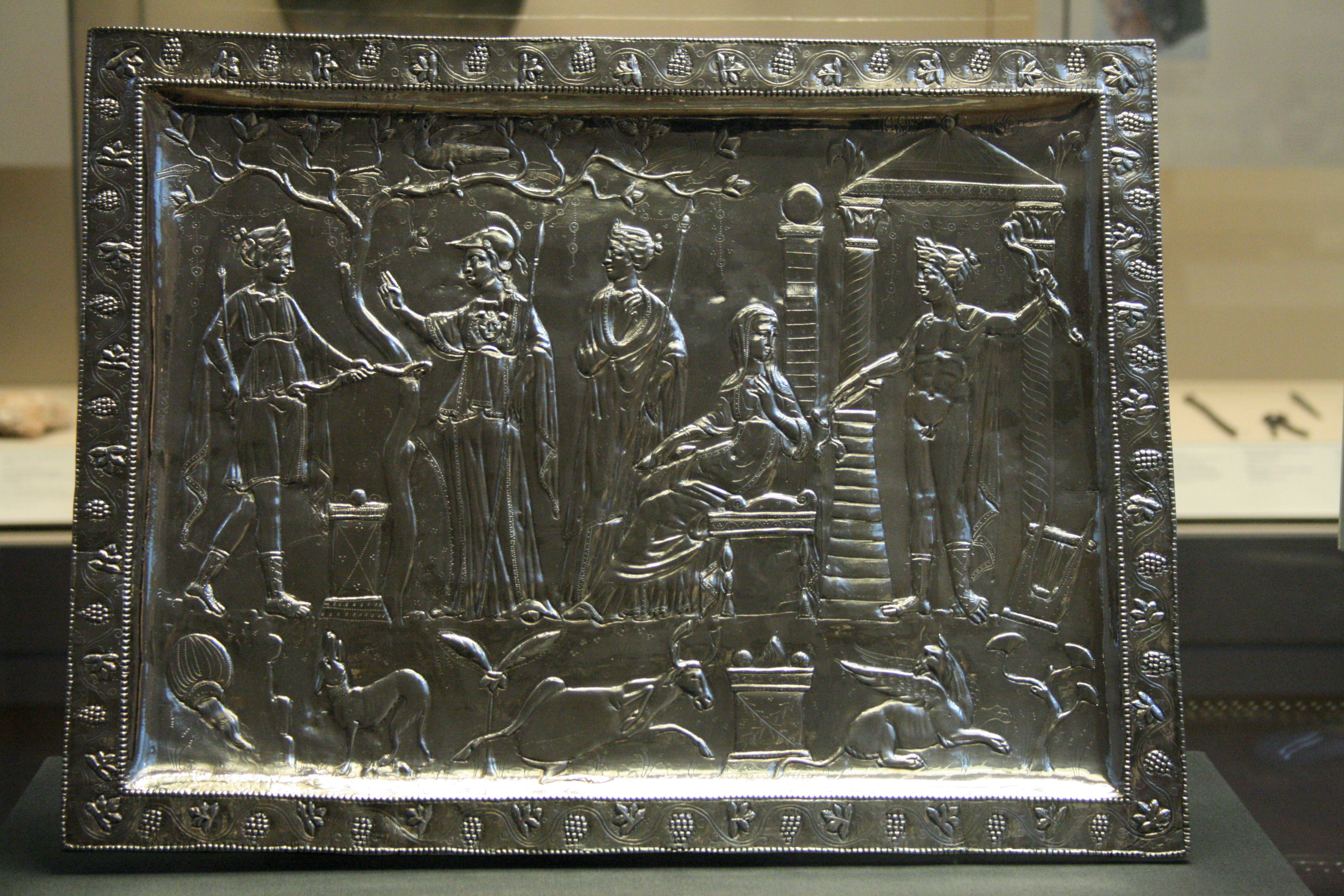
Room 49 – Corbridge Lanx, silver tray depicting a shrine to Apollo, northern England, 4th century AD

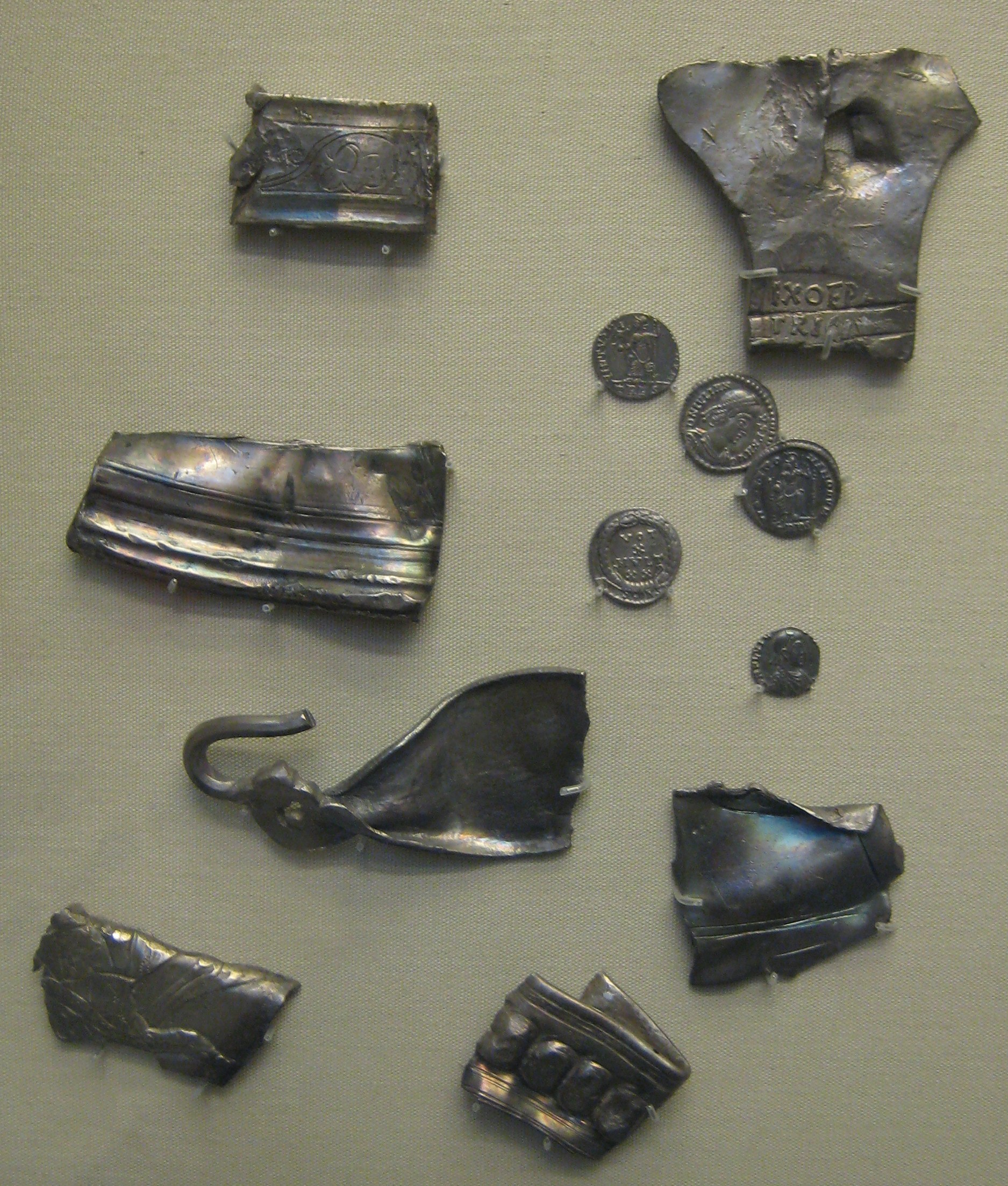
Room 41 – Silver objects from the Roman Coleraine Hoard, Northern Ireland, 4th–5th centuries AD

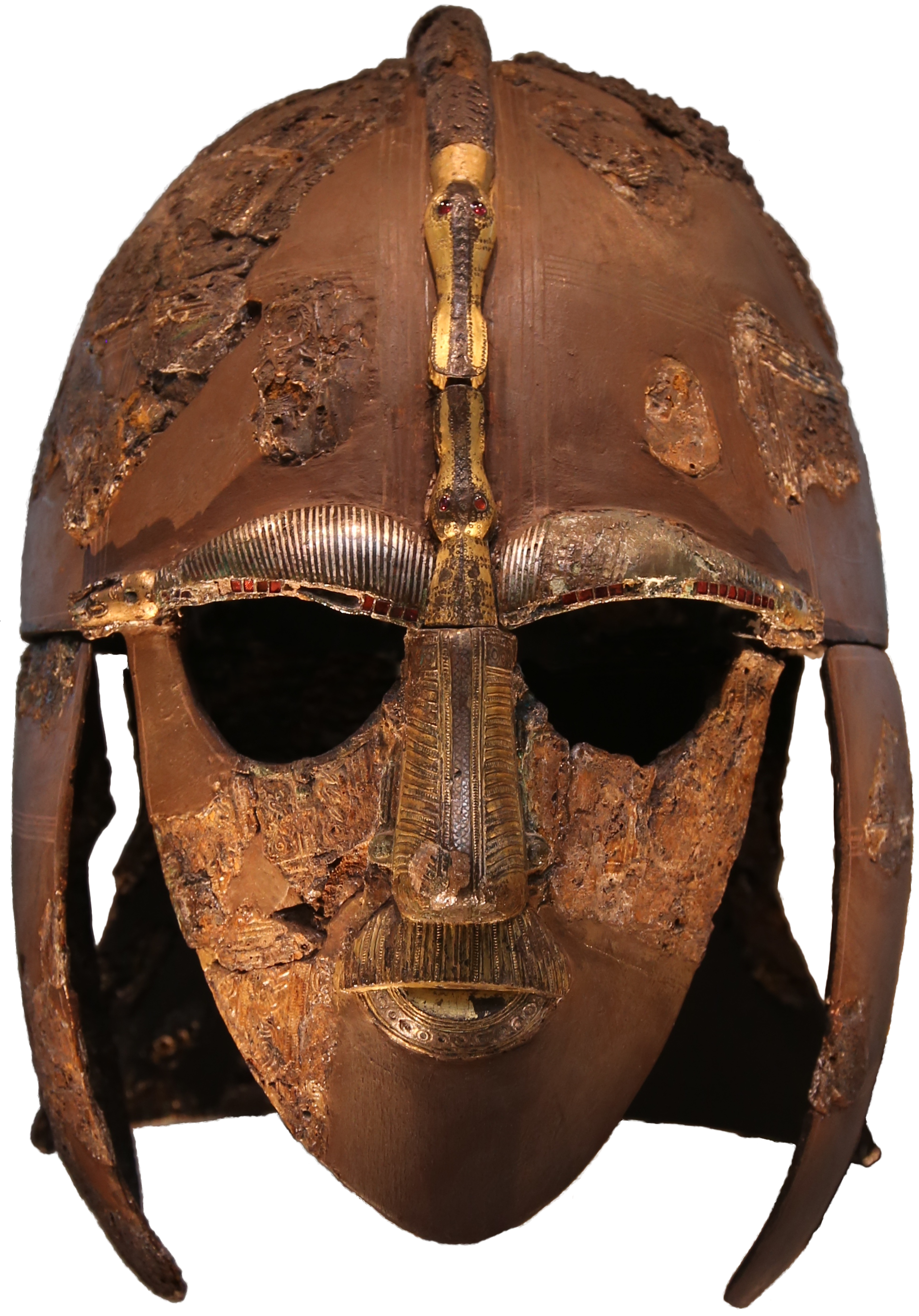
Room 41 – Sutton Hoo helmet, Anglo-Saxon, England, early 7th century AD

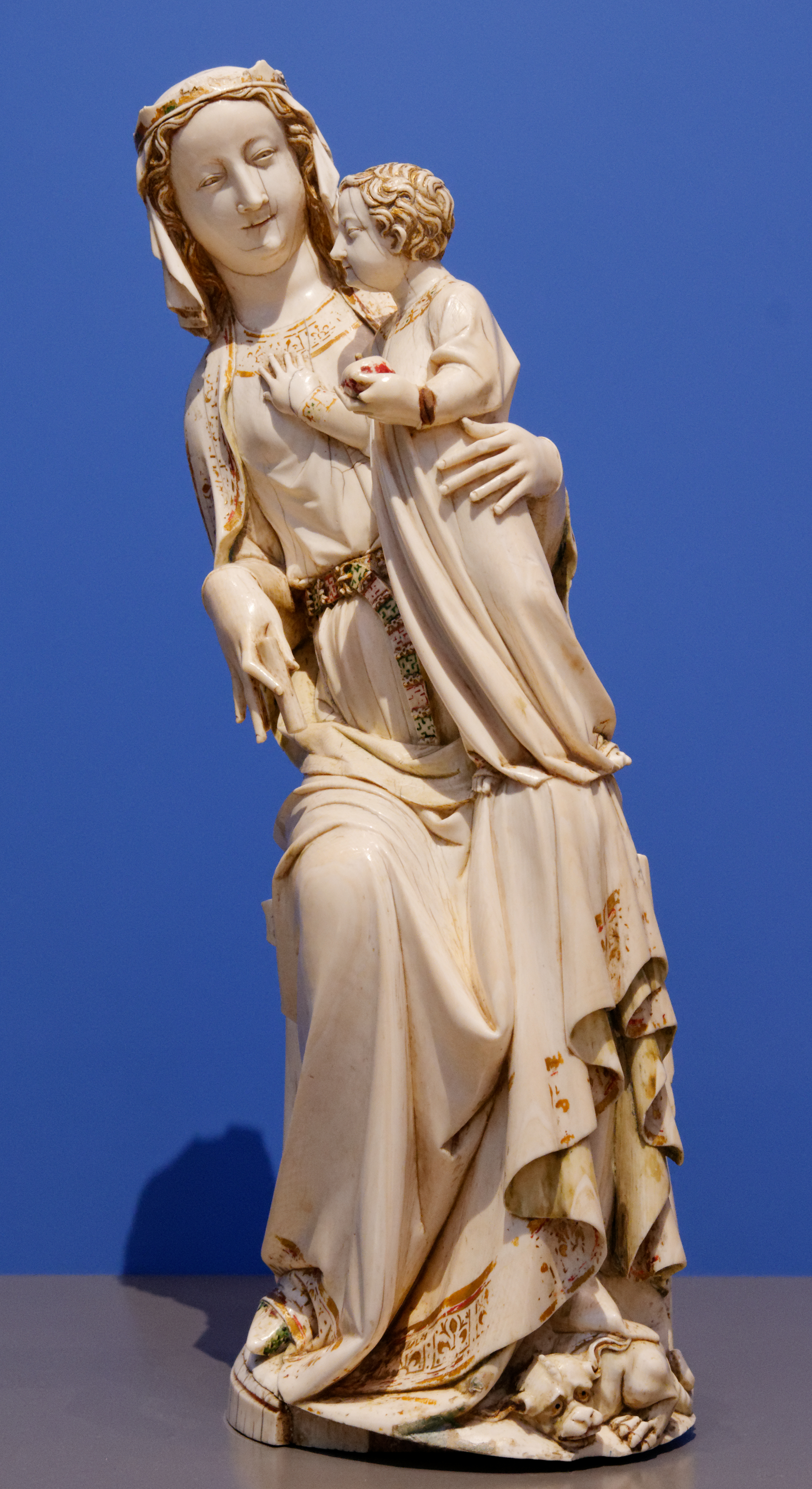
Room 40 – Ivory statue of Virgin and Child, who is crushing a dragon under her left foot from Paris, France, 1310–1330 AD

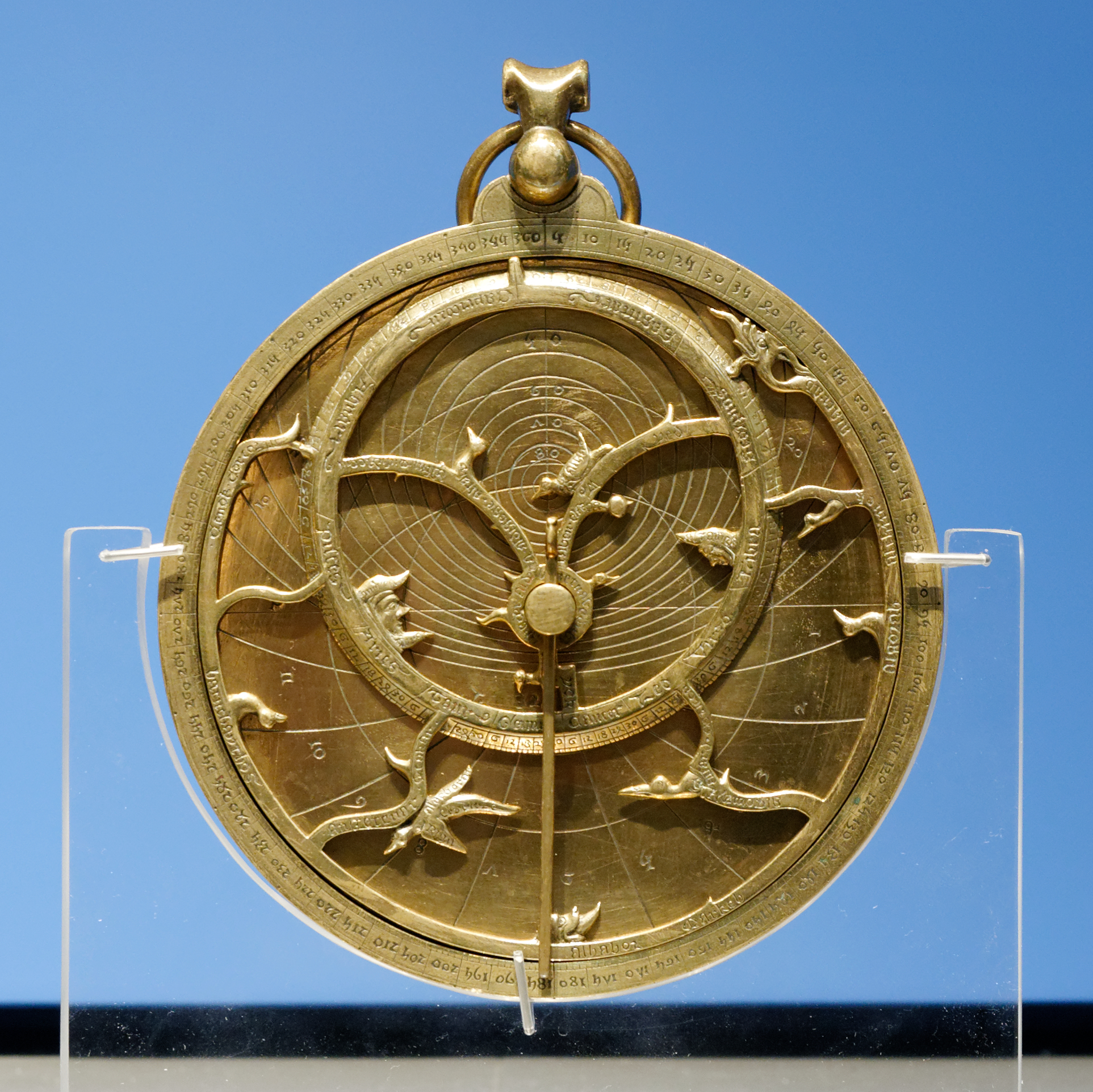
Room 40 – Chaucer Astrolabe, the oldest dated in Europe, 1326 AD

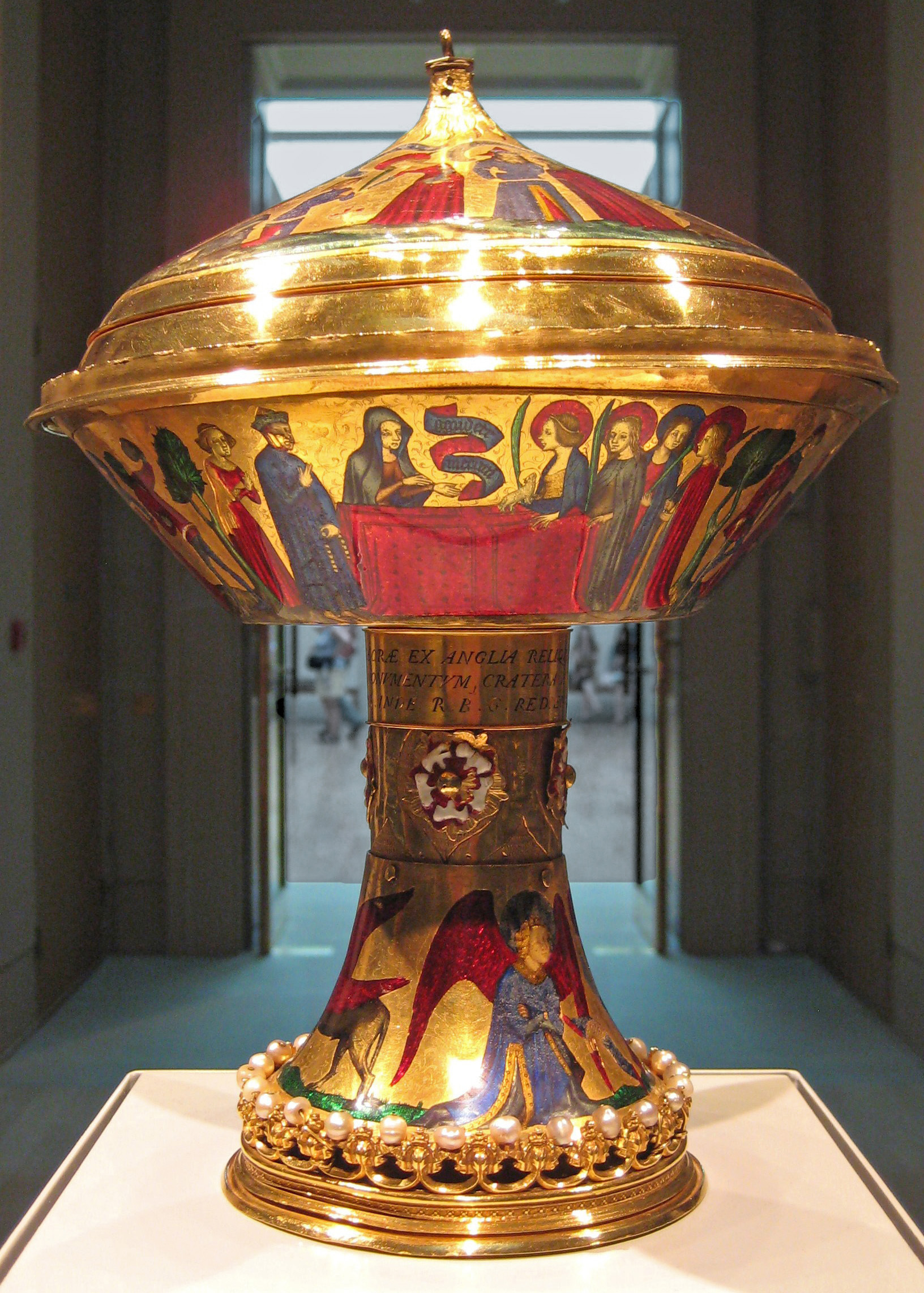
Room 40 – Royal Gold Cup or Saint Agnes Cup, made in Paris, France, 1370–80 AD

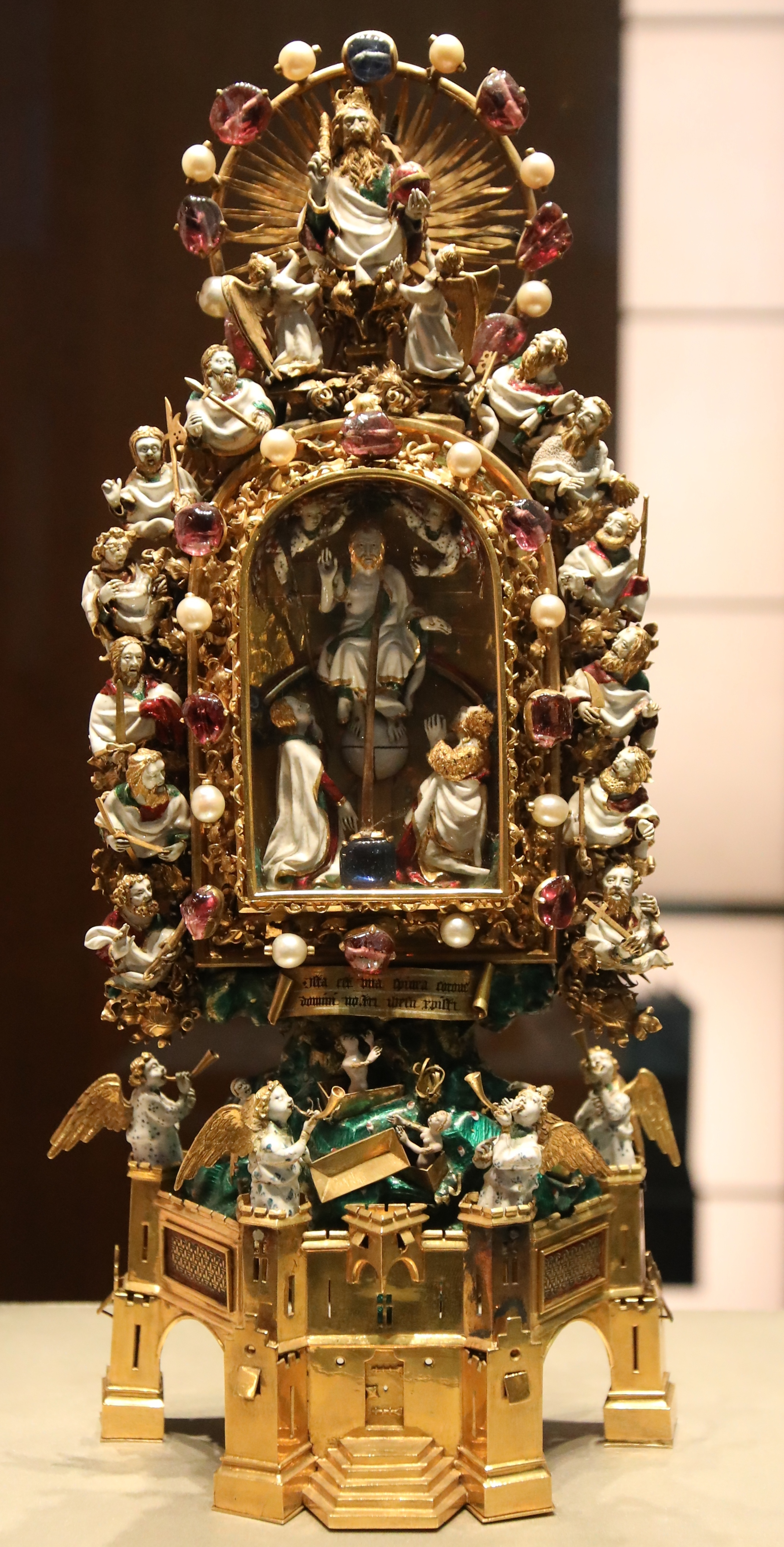
Room 2a – Holy Thorn Reliquary, made in Paris, c. 1390s AD

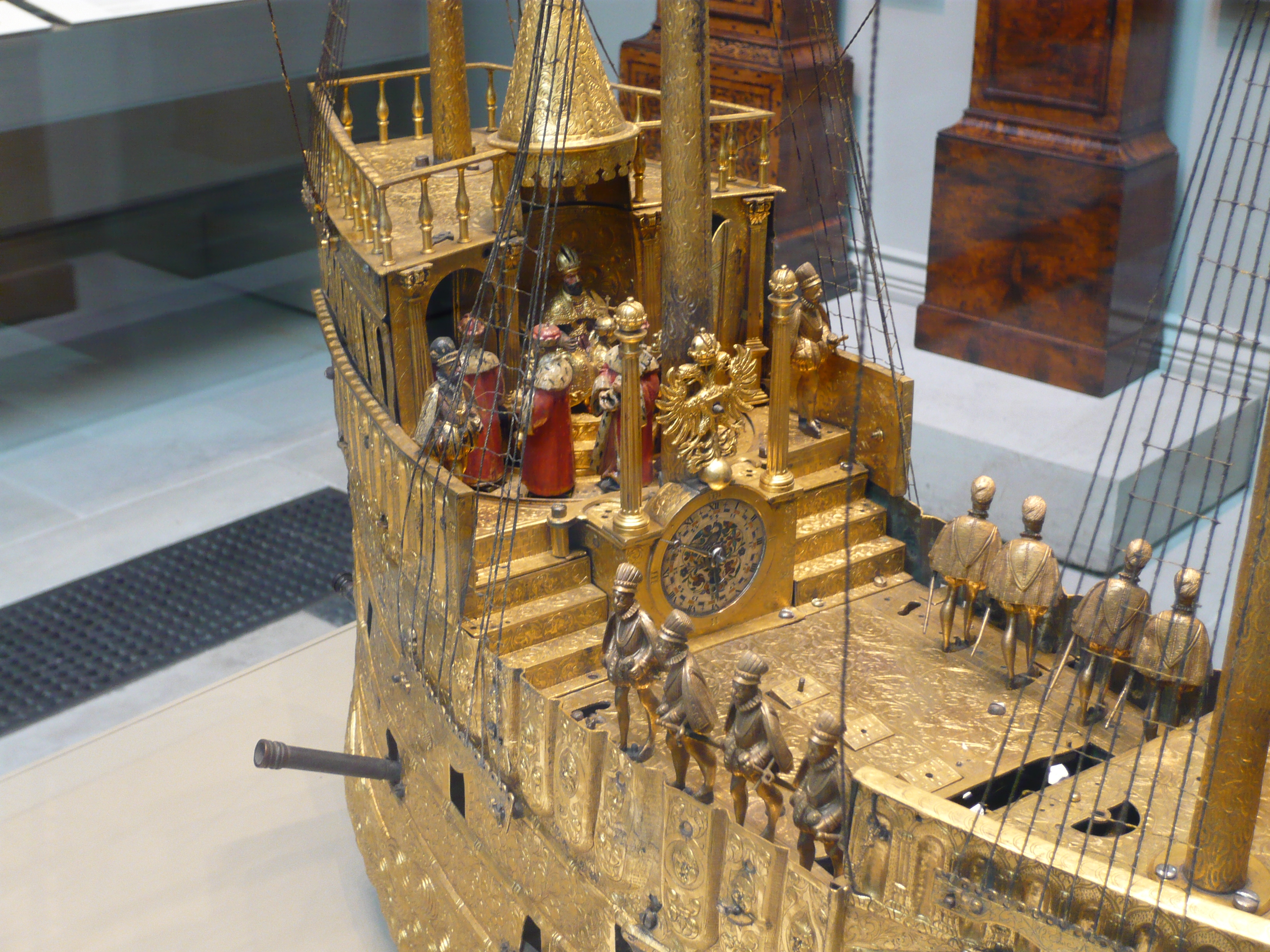
Room 38 – Mechanical Galleon clock, Augsburg, Germany, around 1585 AD

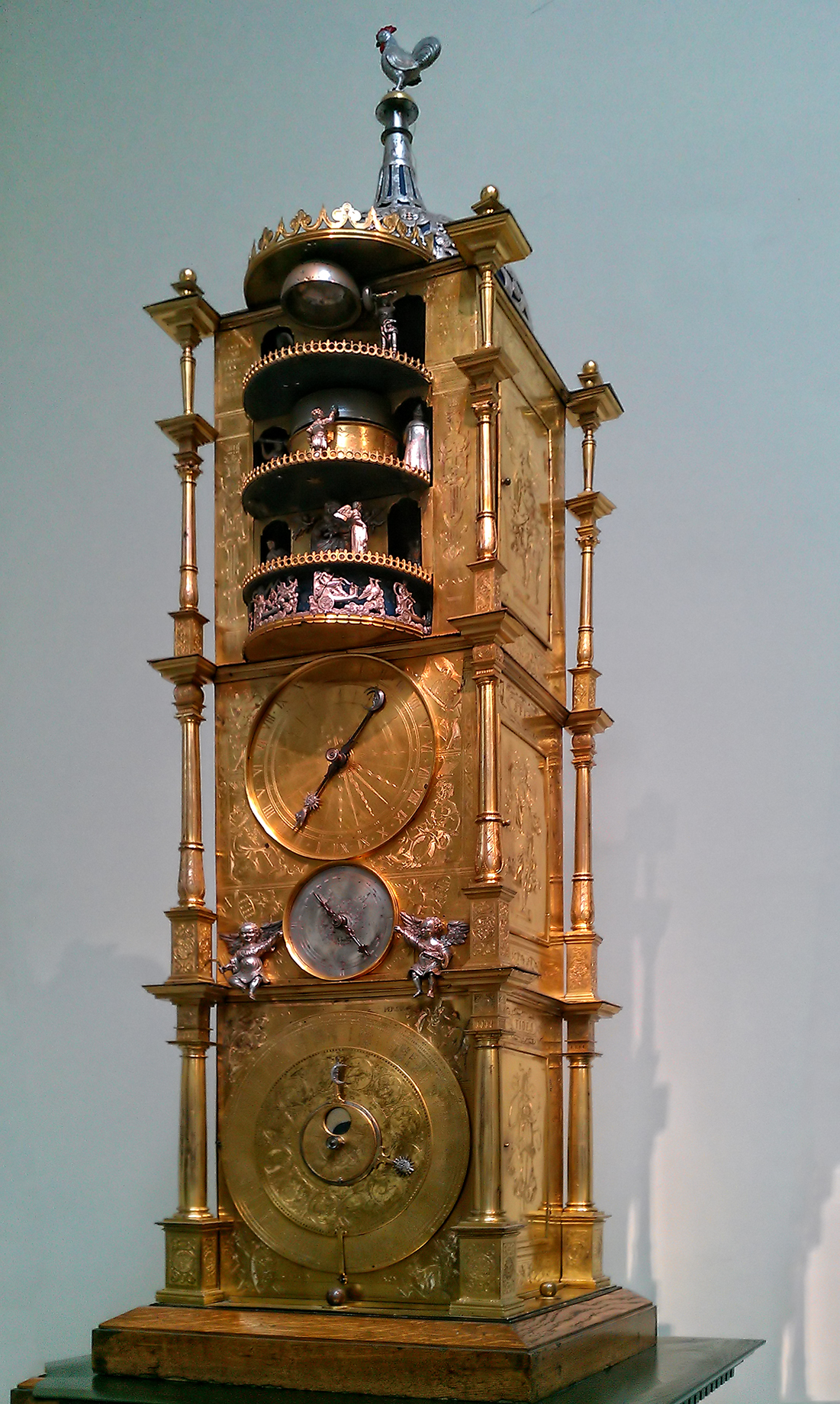
Room 38 – Carillon clock with automata by Isaac Habrecht, Switzerland, 1589 AD

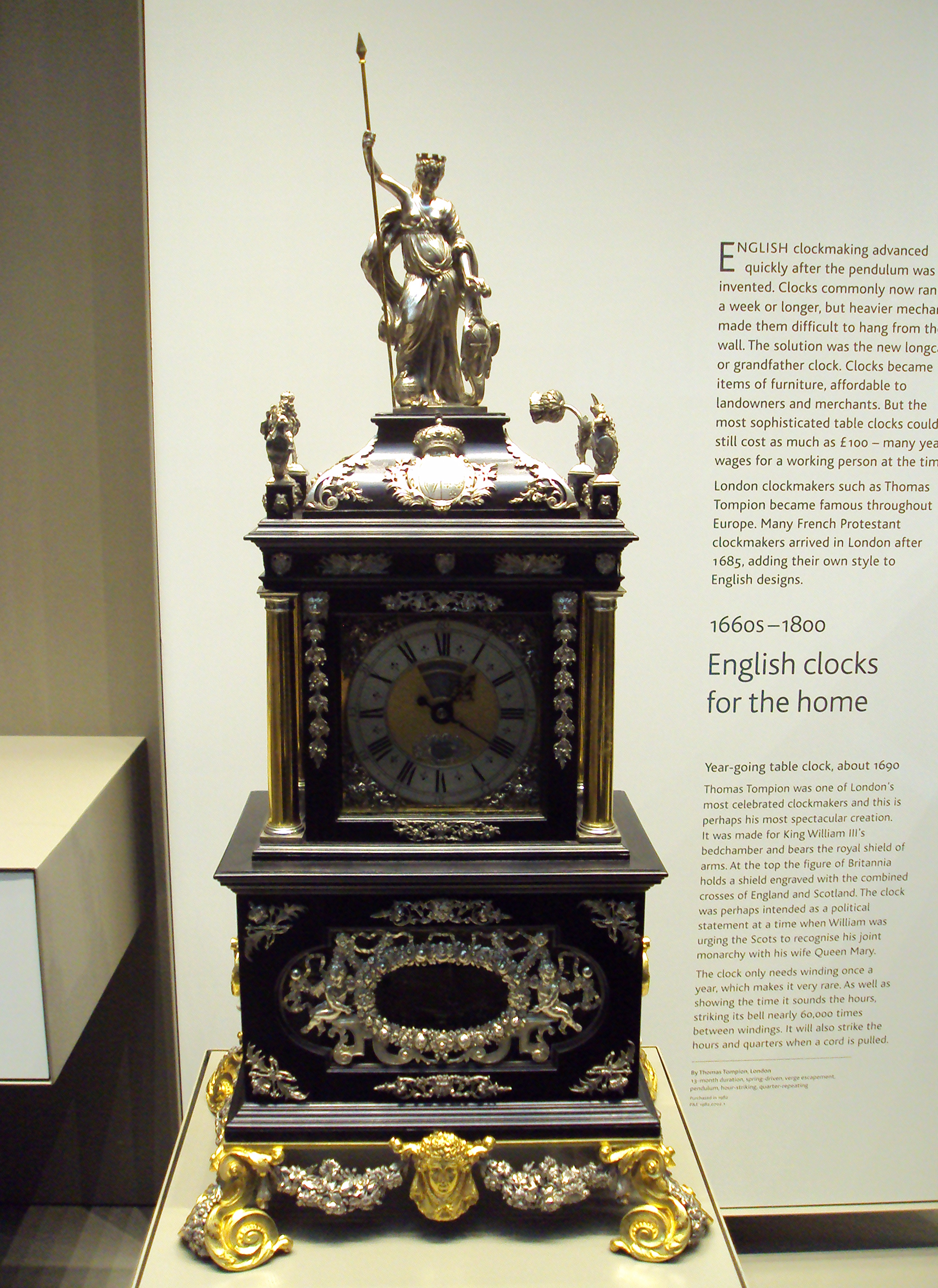
Room 39 – Ornate clock made by Thomas Tompion, England, 1690 AD

=== Department of Asia ===
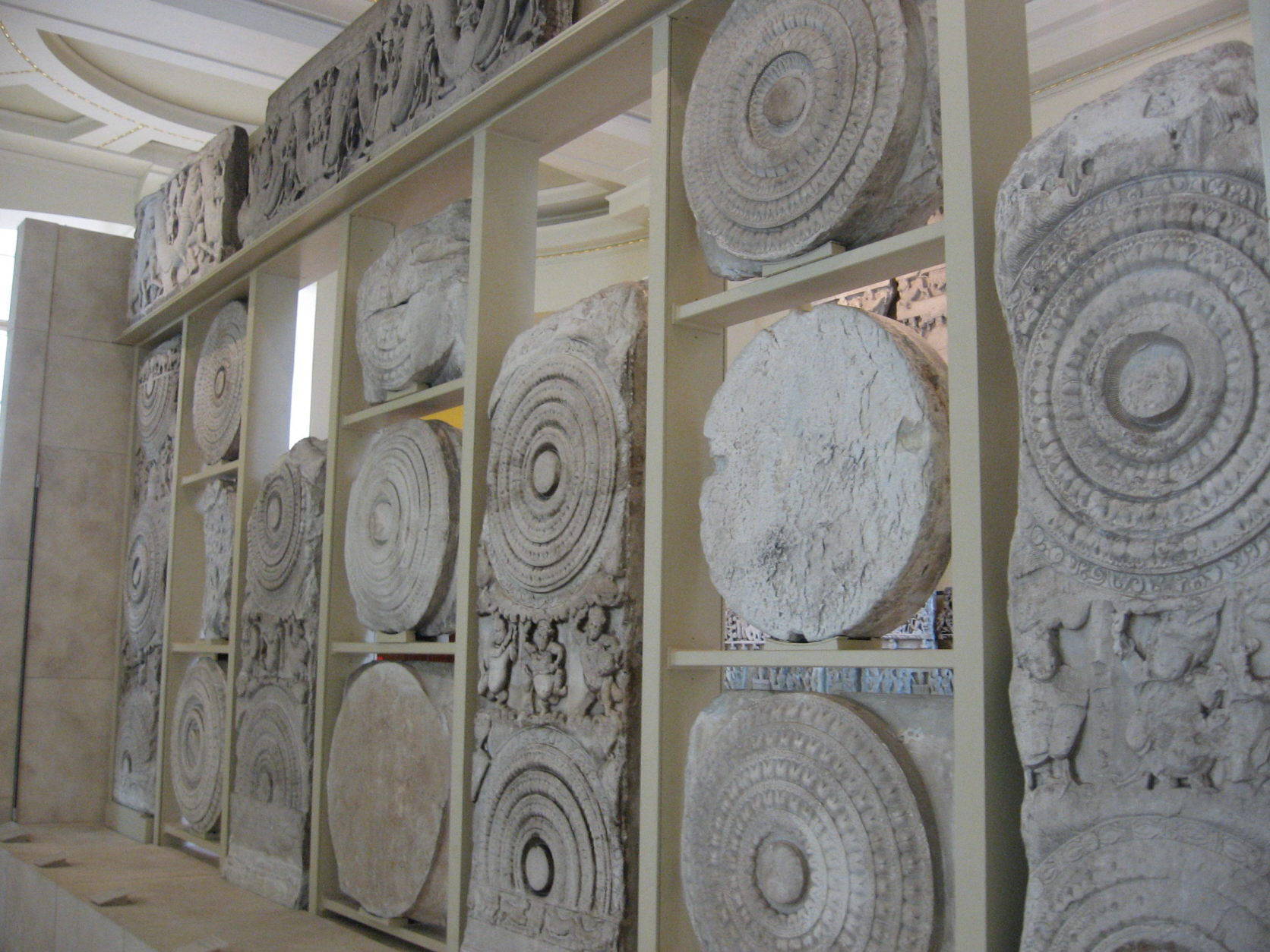
Room 33a – Amaravati Sculptures, southern India, 1st century BC and 3rd century AD

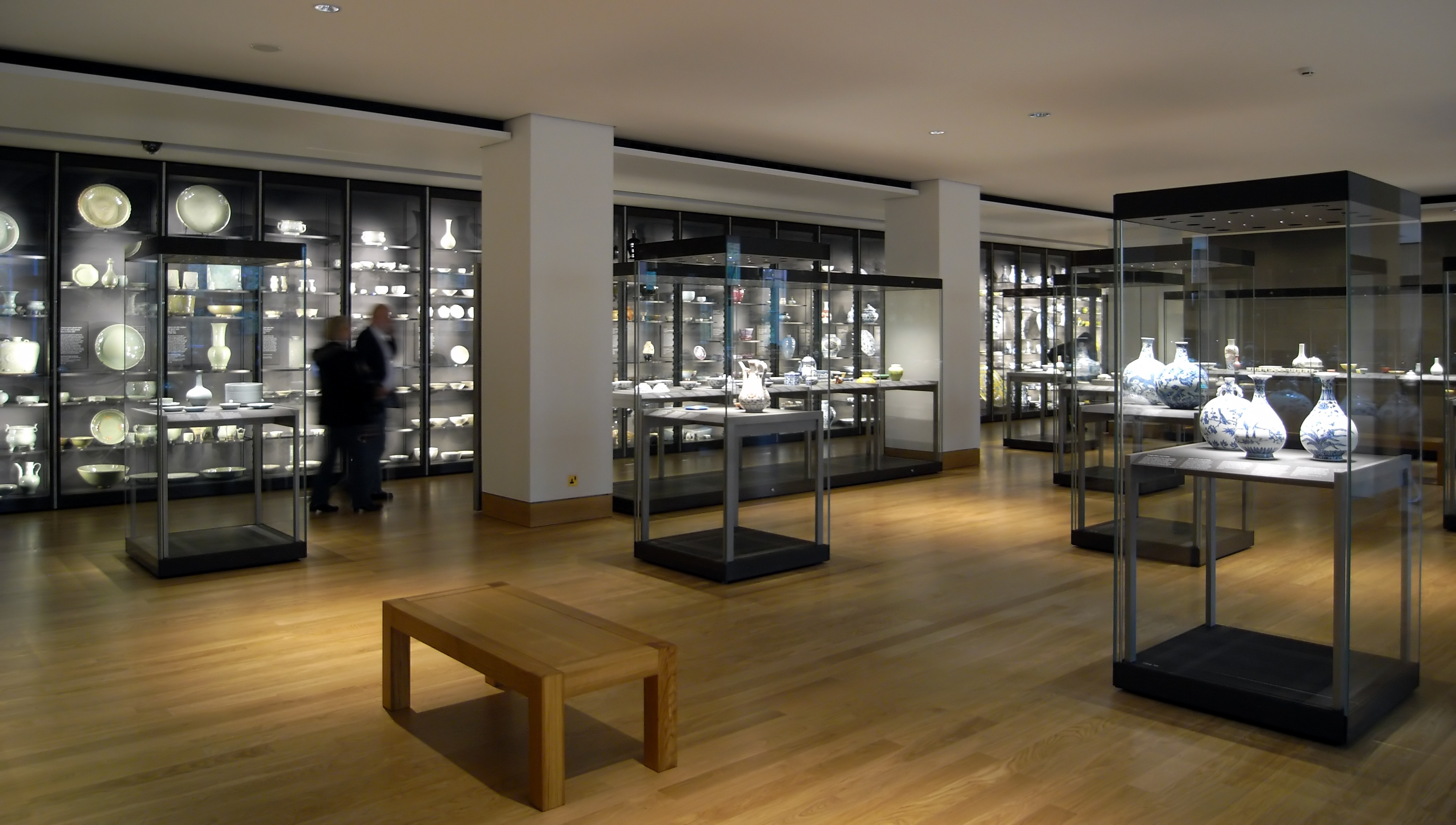
Room 95 – The Percival David collection of Chinese ceramics

The scope of the Department of Asia is extremely broad; its collections of over 75,000 objects cover the material culture of the whole Asian continent and from the Neolithic up to the present day. Until recently, this department concentrated on collecting Oriental antiquities from urban or semi-urban societies across the Asian continent. Many of those objects were collected by colonial officers and explorers in former parts of the British Empire, especially the Indian subcontinent. Examples include the collections made by individuals such as James Wilkinson Breeks, Sir Alexander Cunningham, Sir Harold Deane, Sir Walter Elliot, James Prinsep, Charles Masson, Sir John Marshall and Charles Stuart.

A large number of Chinese antiquities were purchased from the Anglo-Greek banker George Eumorfopoulos in the 1930s. The large collection of some 1,800 Japanese prints and paintings owned by Arthur Morrison was acquired in the early twentieth century. In the second half of the twentieth century, the museum greatly benefited from the bequest of the philanthropist PT Brooke Sewell, which allowed the department to purchase many objects and fill in gaps in the collection.

In 2004, the ethnographic collections from Asia were transferred to the department. These reflect the diverse environment of the largest continent in the world and range from India to China, the Middle East to Japan. Much of the ethnographic material comes from objects originally owned by tribal cultures and hunter-gatherers, many of whose way of life has disappeared in the last century.

Particularly valuable collections are from the Andaman and Nicobar Islands (much assembled by the British naval officer Maurice Portman), Sri Lanka (especially through the colonial administrator Hugh Nevill), Northern Thailand, south-west China, the Ainu of Hokkaido in Japan (chief among them the collection of the Scottish zoologist John Anderson), Siberia (with artefacts collected by the explorer Kate Marsden and Bassett Digby and is notable for its Sakha pieces, especially the ivory model of a summer festival at Yakutsk) and the islands of South-East Asia, especially Borneo. The latter benefited from the purchase in 1905 of the Sarawak collection put together by Dr Charles Hose, as well as from other colonial officers such as Edward A Jeffreys. A unique and valuable group of objects from Java, including shadow puppets and a gamelan musical set, was assembled by Sir Stamford Raffles.

The principal gallery devoted to Asian art in the museum is Gallery 33 with its comprehensive display of Chinese, Indian subcontinent and South-east Asian objects. An adjacent gallery showcases the Amaravati sculptures and monuments. Other galleries on the upper floors are devoted to its Japanese, Korean, painting and calligraphy, and Chinese ceramics collections.

Highlights of the collections include:

- A small but comprehensive collection of sculpture from the Indian subcontinent, including some of the Amaravati Marbles, Buddhist limestone reliefs excavated by Sir Walter Elliot.
- A collection of Chinese antiquities, paintings, and porcelain, lacquer, bronze, jade, and other applied arts.
- The Frau Olga-Julia Wegener collection of 147 Chinese paintings from the Tang to the Qing dynasties.
- The most comprehensive collection of Japanese pre-20th century art in the Western world, many of which originally belonged to the surgeon William Anderson and diplomat Ernest Mason Satow.

East Asia

- A large collection of Chinese ritual bronzes, including a wine vessel in the shape of two rams supporting a jar, (1500–200 BC)
- Jade bi or disc with inscription from the Qianlong Emperor, (1500–1050 BC)
- Group of oracle bones that were used for divination from the Shang dynasty, China, (1200–1050 BC)
- Intricately designed gold dagger handle from Eastern Zhou period, China, (6th–5th centuries BC)
- Huixian Bronze Hu, an identical pair of bronze vessels from the Eastern Zhou period, China, (5th century BC)
- Japanese antiquities from the Kofun period excavated by the pioneering archaeologist William Gowland, (3rd–6th centuries AD)
- Three ornate bronze Dōtaku or bells from the Yayoi period, Japan, (200 BC – 200 AD)
- Gilded and inscribed Han dynasty wine-cup made from lacquer and found in Pyongyang, Korea (4 AD)
- Gandharan architectural wood carvings, furniture and dress accessories from Loulan, Xinjiang, (4th century AD)
- The famous Admonitions Scroll by Chinese artist Gu Kaizhi, (344–406 AD)
- The colossal Amitābha Buddha from Hancui, China, (585 AD)
- A set of ceramic Tang dynasty tomb figures of Liu Tingxun, (c. 728 AD)
- Silk Princess painting from Dandan-oilik Buddhist sanctuary in Khotan, Xinjiang, China, (7th–8th century AD)
- Seated Luohan from Yixian, one from a set of eight surviving statues, China, (907–1125 AD)
- Hoard of Tang dynasty silverware from Beihuangshan, Shaanxi, China, (9th–10th centuries AD)
- Seventeen examples of extremely rare Ru ware, the largest collection in the West, (1100 AD)
- A fine assemblage of Buddhist scroll paintings from Dunhuang, western China, collected by the British-Hungarian explorer Aurel Stein, (5th–11th centuries AD)
- Pericival David collection of Chinese ceramics, (10th–18th centuries AD)
- Ivory stand in the form of a seated lion, Chos-'khor-yan-rtse monastery in Tibet, (13th century AD)
- Copy of a hanging scroll painting of Minamoto no Yoritomo, first Shogun of Japan, (14th century AD)
- Handscroll silk painting called 'Fascination of Nature' by Xie Chufang depicting insects and plants, China, (1321 AD)
- Ornate Sino-Tibetan figure of Buddha Sakyamuni made of gilded bronze, China, (1403–1424 AD)
- Large Cloisonné jar with dragon made for the Ming dynasty Imperial Court, paired with another in the Rietberg Museum, Zürich, Beijing, China, (1426–35 AD)
- Pair of ceramic Kakiemon elephants from Japan, (17th century AD)
- Moon jar from the Joseon Dynasty collected by the potter Bernard Leach, Korea, (18th century AD)
- Japanese prints including 3 of the original impressions of The Great Wave off Kanagawa, (1829–32 AD)
- Illustrations for the Great Picture Book of Everything, rare album of drawings by the celebrated Japanese artist Hokusai, (1820–1840 AD)

South Asia

- Excavated objects from the Indus Valley sites of Mohenjo-daro, and Harappa, Ancient India (now in Pakistan), (2500–2000 BC)
- Hoard of Copper Hoard Culture celts, plaques and disc from Gungeria, Madhya Pradesh, India, (2000–1000 BC)
- Assembly of prehistoric artefacts from the Nilgiri Hills in southern India, (10th century BC – 2nd century AD)
- Hoard of Iron Age metal weapons excavated at the Wurreegaon barrow near Kamptee in Maharastra, India, (7th – 1st centuries BC)
- Sandstone fragment of a Pillar of Ashoka with Brahmi inscription from Meerut, Uttar Pradesh, India, (238 BC)
- The Kulu Vase found near a monastery in Himachal Pradesh, one of the earliest examples of figurative art from the sub-continent, northern India, (1st century BC)
- Copper plate from Taxila, with important Kharoshthi inscription, Ancient India (now in Pakistan), (1st century BC – 1st century AD)
- Indo-Scythian sandstone Mathura Lion Capital and Bracket figure from one of the gateways to the Great Stupa at Sanchi, central India, (1st century AD)
- Bimaran Casket and Wardak Vase, reliquaries from ancient stupas in Afghanistan, (1st–2nd centuries AD)
- Hoard of gold jewellery with precious stones found under the Enlightenment Throne at the Mahabodhi Temple, Bodh Gaya, eastern India, (2nd century AD)
- Relic deposits from stupas at Ahin Posh, Ali Masjid, Gudivada, Manikyala, Sonala Pind, Sanchi and Taxila, (1st–3rd centuries AD)
- Seated Hārītī and Buddha statues and other Gandhara sculptures from Kafir Kot, Jamal Garhi, Takht-i-Bahi and Yusufzai, Pakistan, (1st–3rd centuries AD)
- Hephthalite silver bowl with hunting scenes from the Swat District, Pakistan, (460–479 AD)
- Three sandstone carved sculptures of the Buddha in Gupta style from Sarnath, eastern India, (5th–6th centuries AD)
- Aphsad inscription of Ādityasena with important record of the genealogy of the Later Gupta dynasty up to king Ādityasena, Ghosrawan, Bihar, India, (675 AD)
- The Buddhapad Hoard of bronze images from southern India, (6th–8th centuries AD)
- Small bronze figure of Buddha Shakyamuni, Bihar, eastern India, (7th century AD)
- Stone statue of Buddha from the Sultanganj hoard, Bihar, eastern India, (7th–8th centuries AD)
- Earliest known figure of the dancing four-armed god Shiva Nataraja, Pallava dynasty, southern India (800 AD)
- Statue of Tara from Sri Lanka and the Thanjavur Shiva from Tamil Nadu, southern India, (8th century & 10th century AD)
- Standing Pala statue of Buddha from Kurkihar, Bihar, India, (9th century AD)
- Several wooden architectural panels from the Kashmir Smast caves, northern Pakistan, (9th–10th centuries AD)
- Hoard of Buddhist terracotta sealings from the Pala period found at the Nālandā Monastery, Bihar, eastern India, (10th century AD)
- Statue of the goddess Ambika found at Dhar in central India, (1034 AD)
- Foundation inscription of the Ananta Vasudeva Temple in Bhubaneswar, Odisha, eastern India, (1278 AD)
- Jade dragon cup that once belonged to Sultan Ulugh Beg from Samarkand, Uzbekistan, (1420–1449 AD)
- Foundation inscription with Arabic inscription in Naskh script in the name of Sultan Yusufshah from Gauda, Bengal, eastern India, (1477 AD)
- Large standing gilded copper figure of the Bodhisattva Avalokiteśvara, Nepal, (15th–16th centuries AD)

Southeast Asia

- Earthenware tazza from the Phùng Nguyên culture, northern Vietnam, (2000–1500 BC)
- Pottery vessels and sherds from the ancient site of Ban Chiang, Thailand, (10th–1st centuries BC)
- Bronze bell from Klang and iron socketed axe (tulang mawas) from Perak, western Malaysia, (200 BC–200 AD)
- Group of six Buddhist clay votive plaques found in a cave in Patania, Penang, Malaysia, (6th–11th centuries AD)
- The famous Sambas Treasure of buddhist gold and silver figures from west Borneo, Indonesia, (8th–9th centuries AD)
- Three stone Buddha heads from the temple at Borobodur in Java, Indonesia, (9th century AD)
- Granite Kinnari figure in the shape of a bird from Candi Prambanan in Java, Indonesia, (9th century AD)
- Sandstone Champa figure of a rampant lion, Vietnam, (11th century AD)
- Gilded bronze figure of Śiva holding a rosary, Cambodia, (11th century AD)
- Stone figure representing the upper part of an eleven-headed Avalokiteśvara, Cambodia, (12th century AD)
- Bronze figure of a seated Buddha from Bagan, Burma, (12th–13th centuries AD)
- Hoard of Southern Song dynasty ceramic vessels excavated at Pinagbayanan, Taysan Municipality, Philippines, (12th–13th centuries AD)
- Statue of the Goddess Mamaki from Candi Jago, eastern Java, Indonesia, (13th–14th centuries AD)
- Glazed terracotta tiles from the Shwegugyi Temple erected by king Dhammazedi in Bago, Myanmar, (1476 AD)
- Inscribed bronze figure of a Buddha from Fang District, part of a large SE Asian collection amassed by the Norwegian explorer Carl Bock, Thailand, (1540 AD)
- Large impression of the Buddha's foot made of gilded stone (known as Shwesettaw Footprints) donated by Captain Frederick Marryat, from Ponoodang near Yangon, Myanmar, (18th–19th centuries AD)
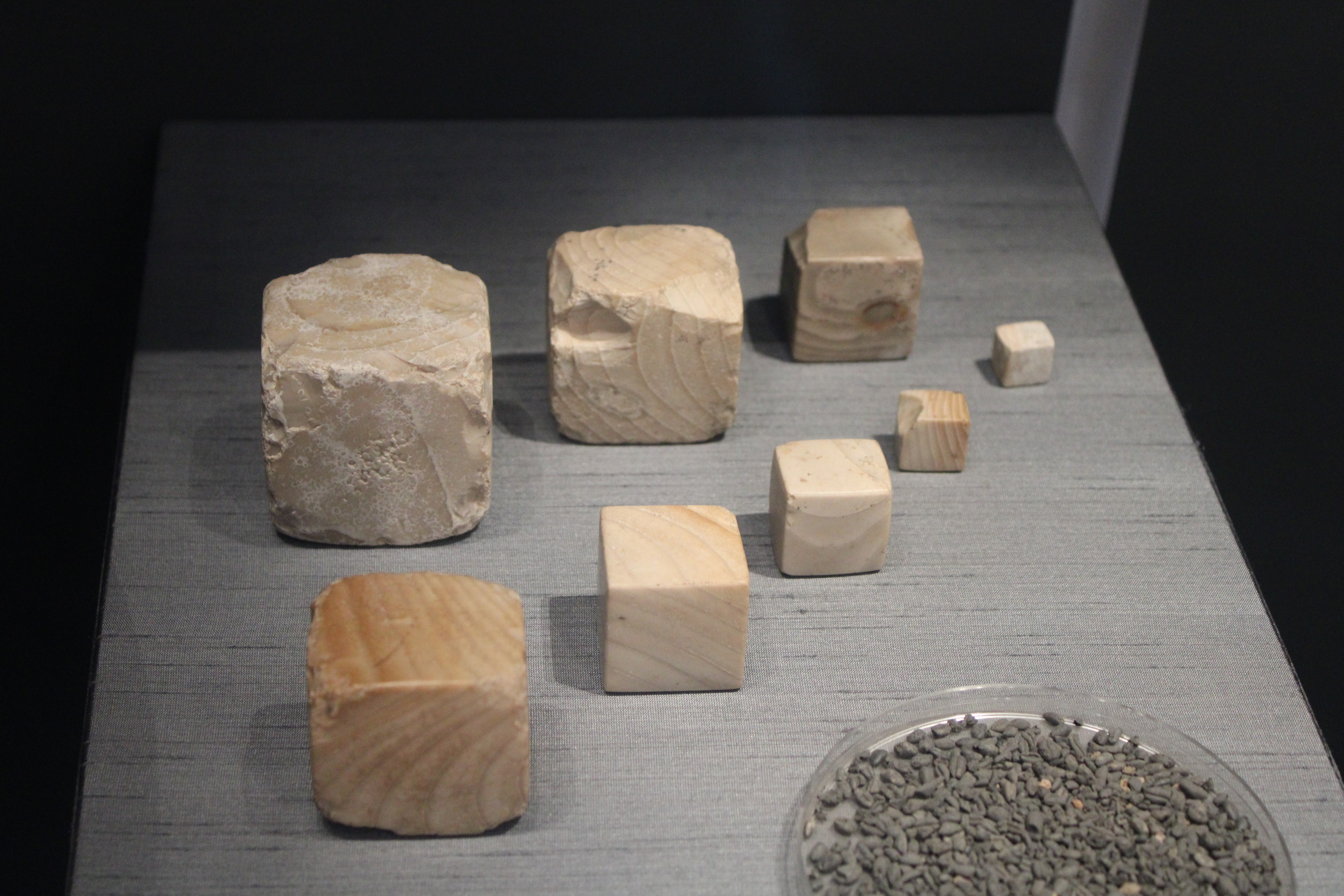
Room 33 – Cubic weights made of chert from Mohenjo-daro, Pakistan, 2600–1900 BC

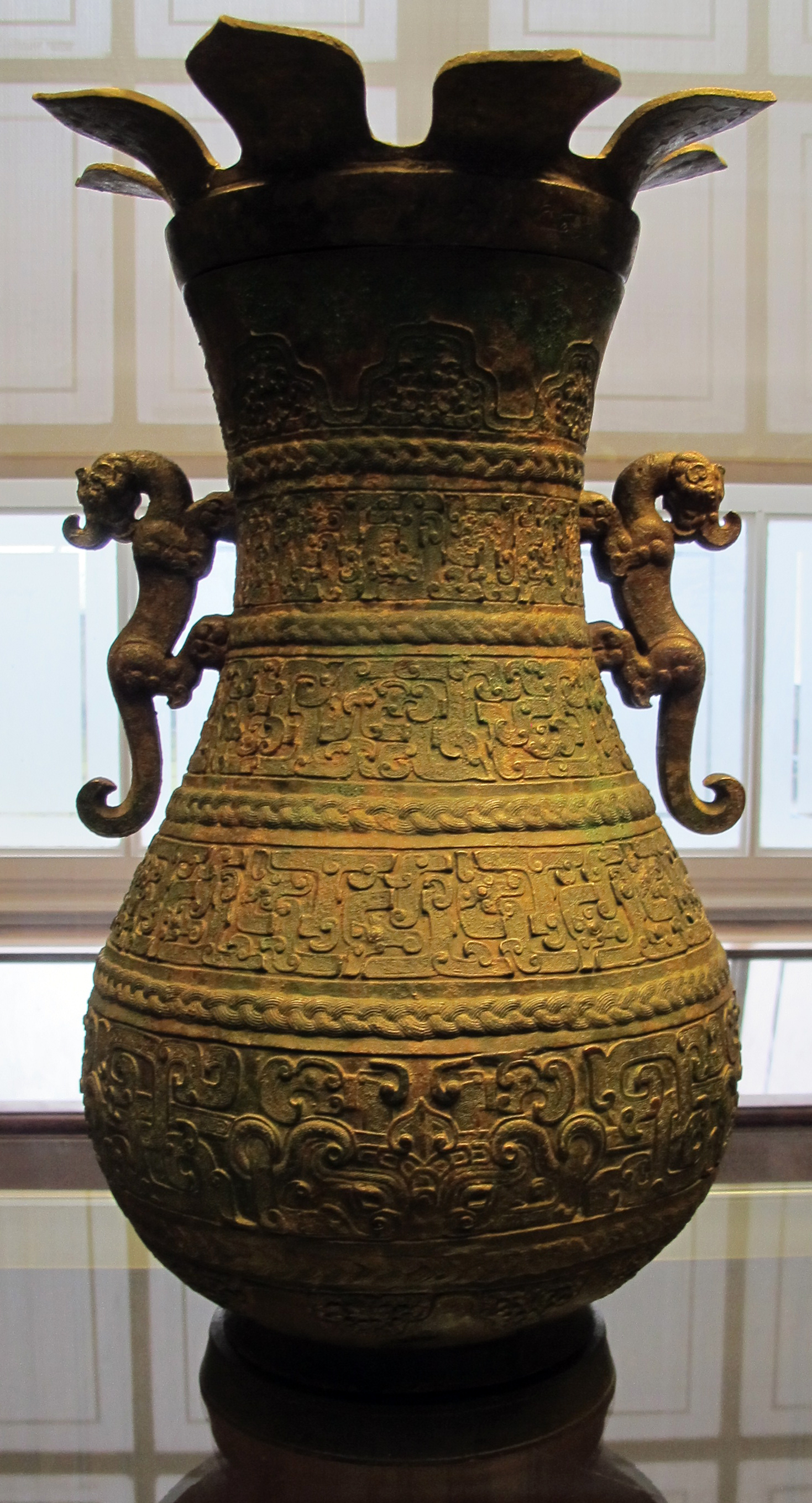
Room 33 – One of the hu from Huixian, China, 5th century BC

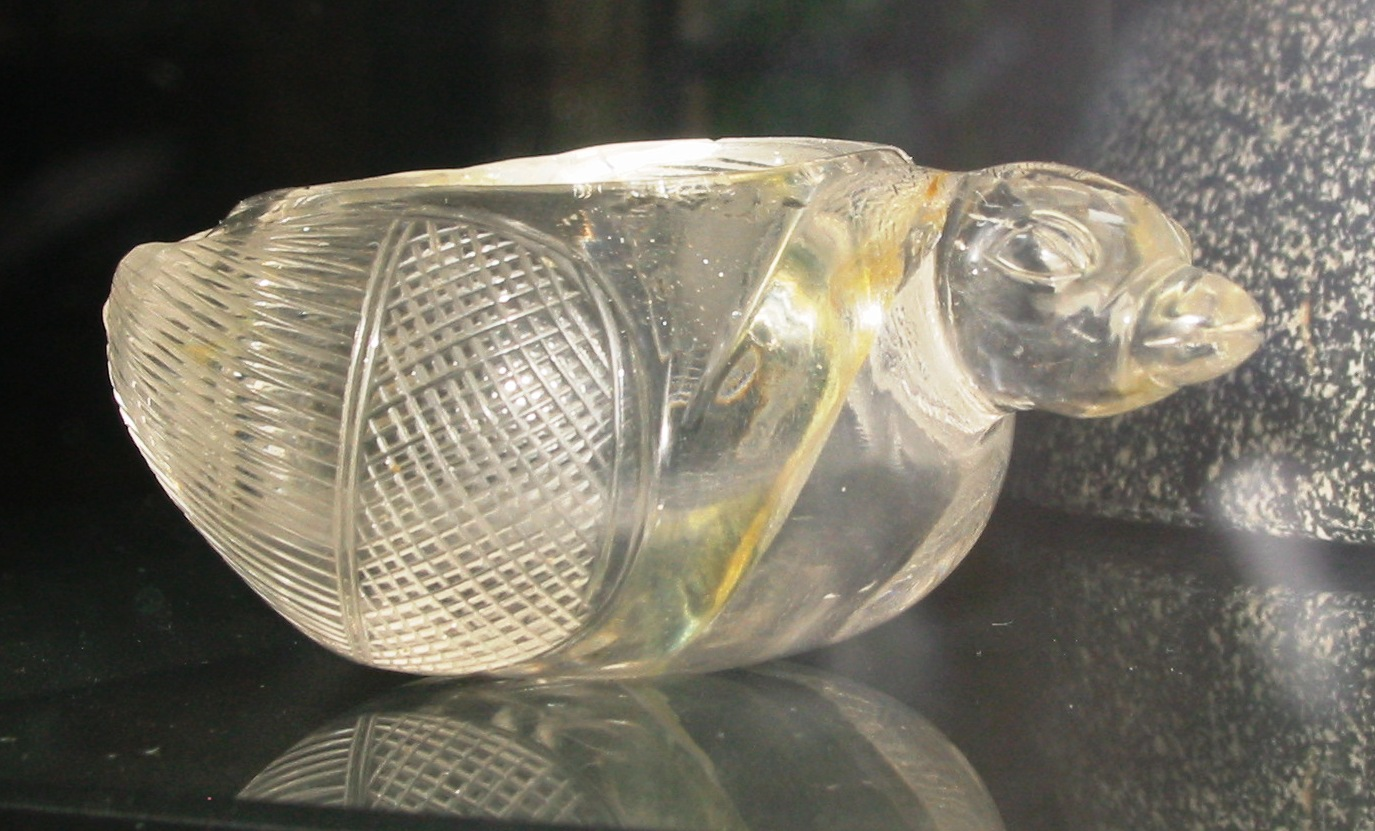
Room 33 – A hamsa sacred goose vessel made of crystal from Stupa 32, Taxila, Pakistan, 1st century AD

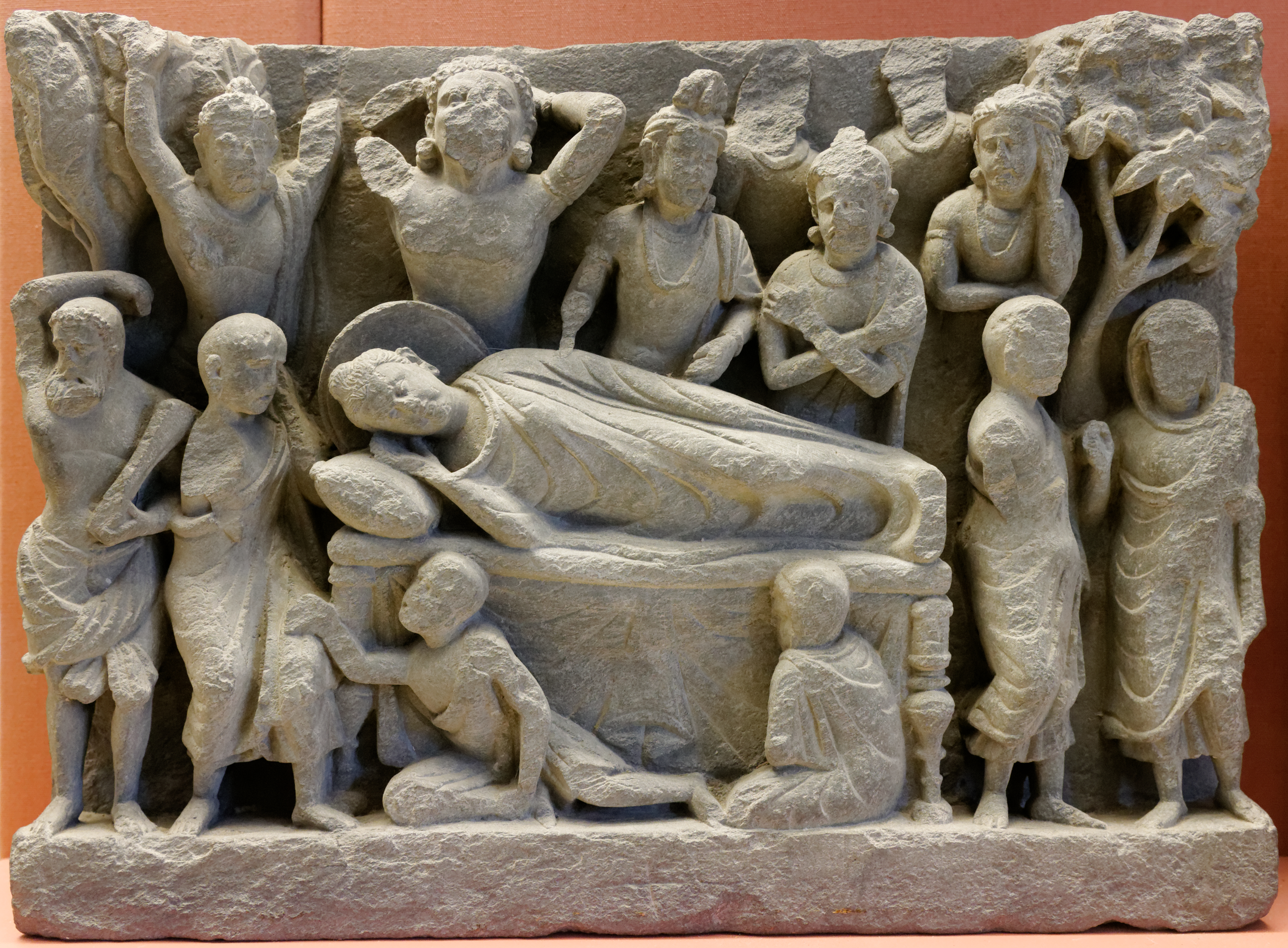
Room 33 – Stone sculpture of the death of Buddha, Gandhara, Pakistan, 1st–3rd centuries AD

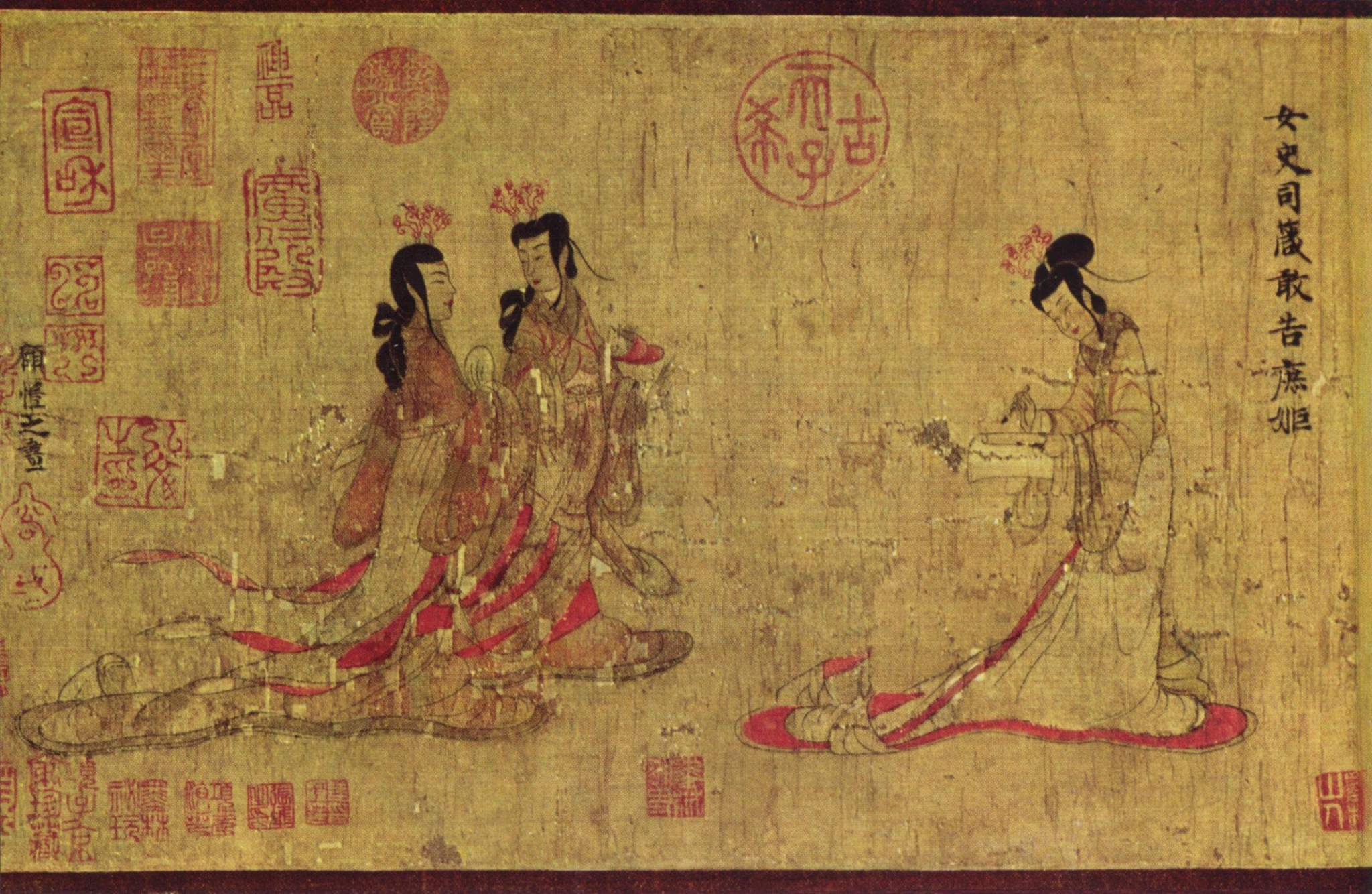
Room 91a – Section of the Admonitions Scroll by Chinese artist Gu Kaizhi, China, c. 380 AD

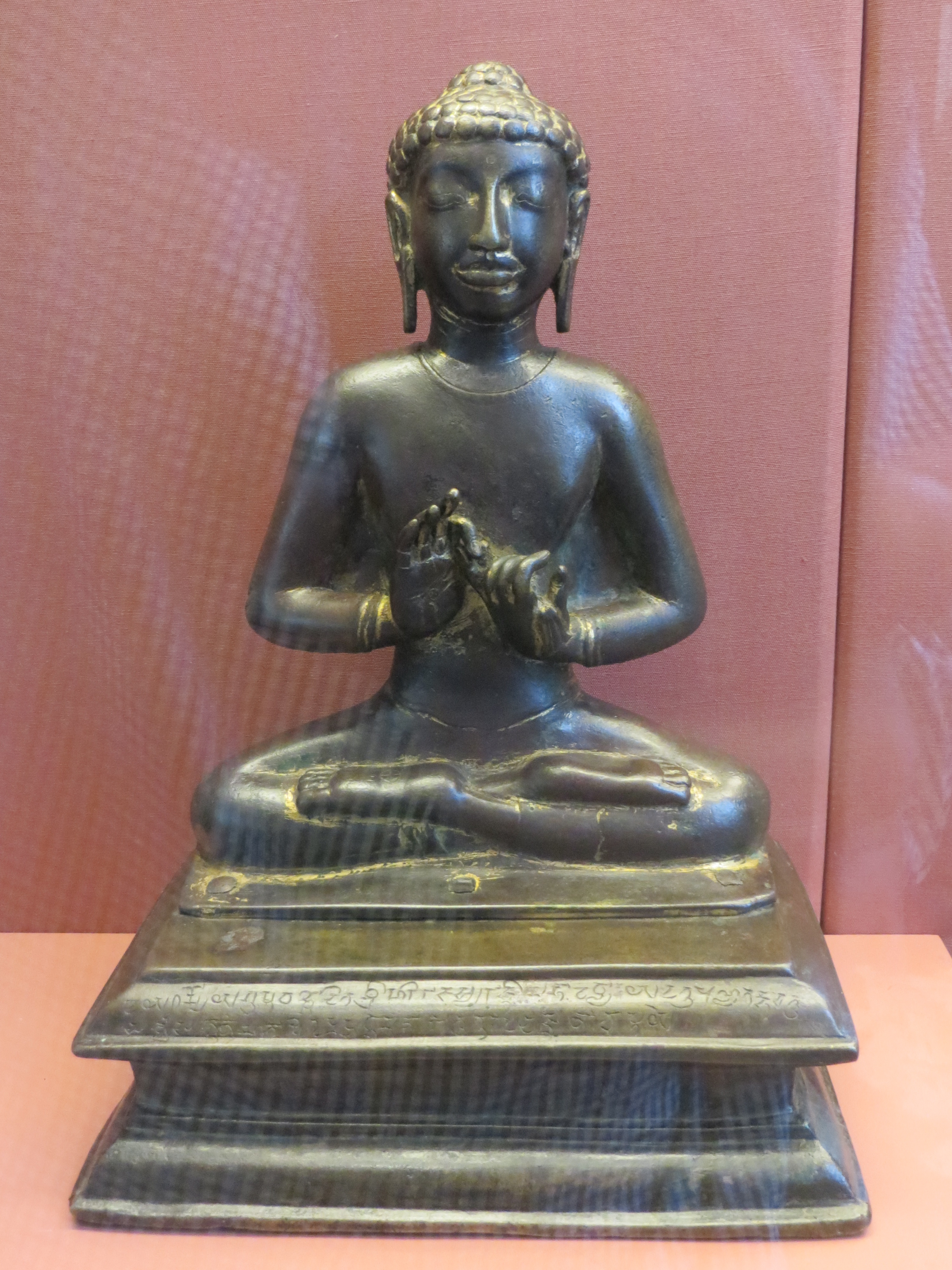
Room 33 – Gilded bronze statue of the Buddha, Dhaneswar Khera, India, 5th century AD

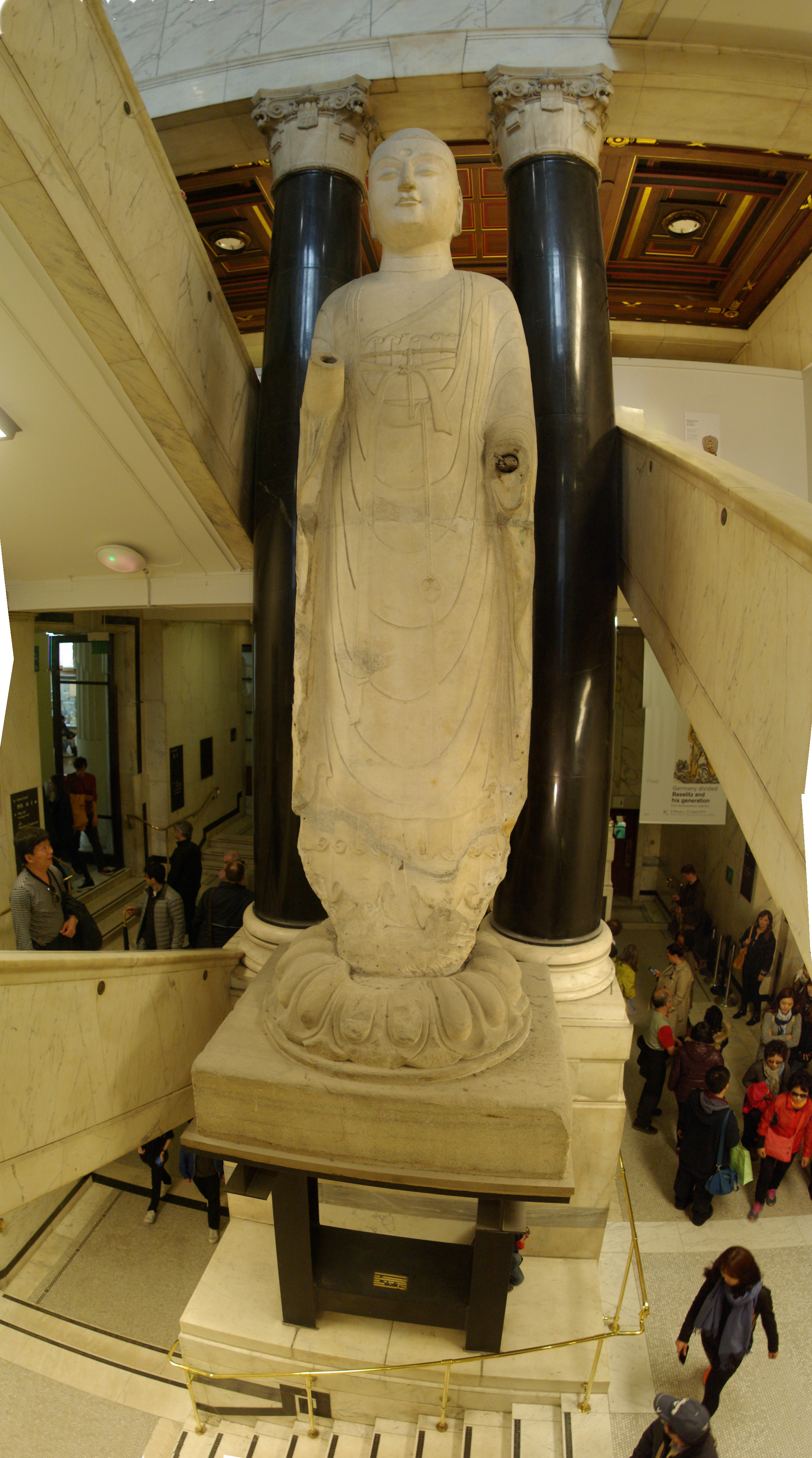
The Amitābha Buddha from Hancui on display in the museum's stairwell, China, 6th century AD

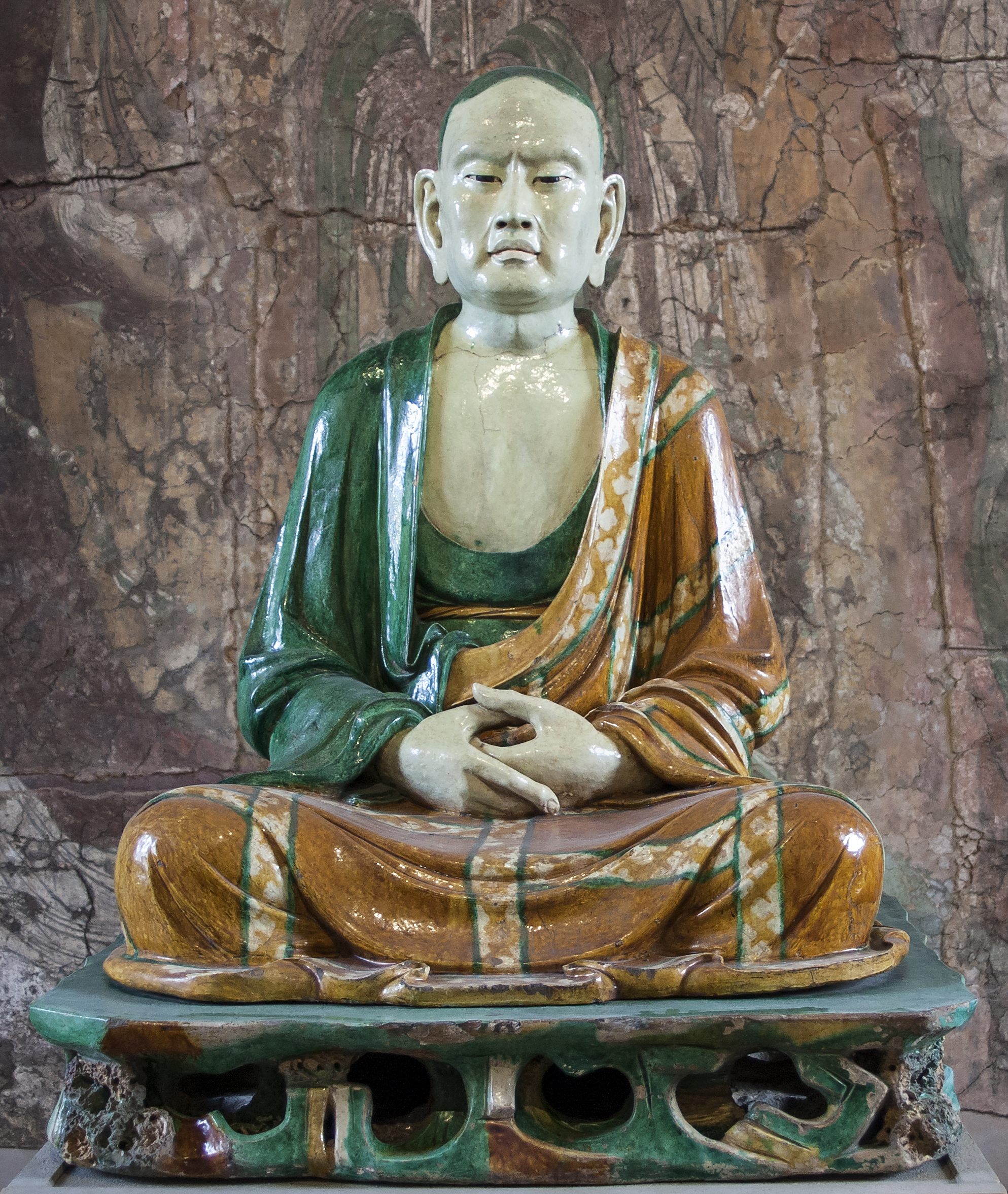
Room 33 – The luohan from Yixian made of glazed stoneware, China, 907–1125 AD

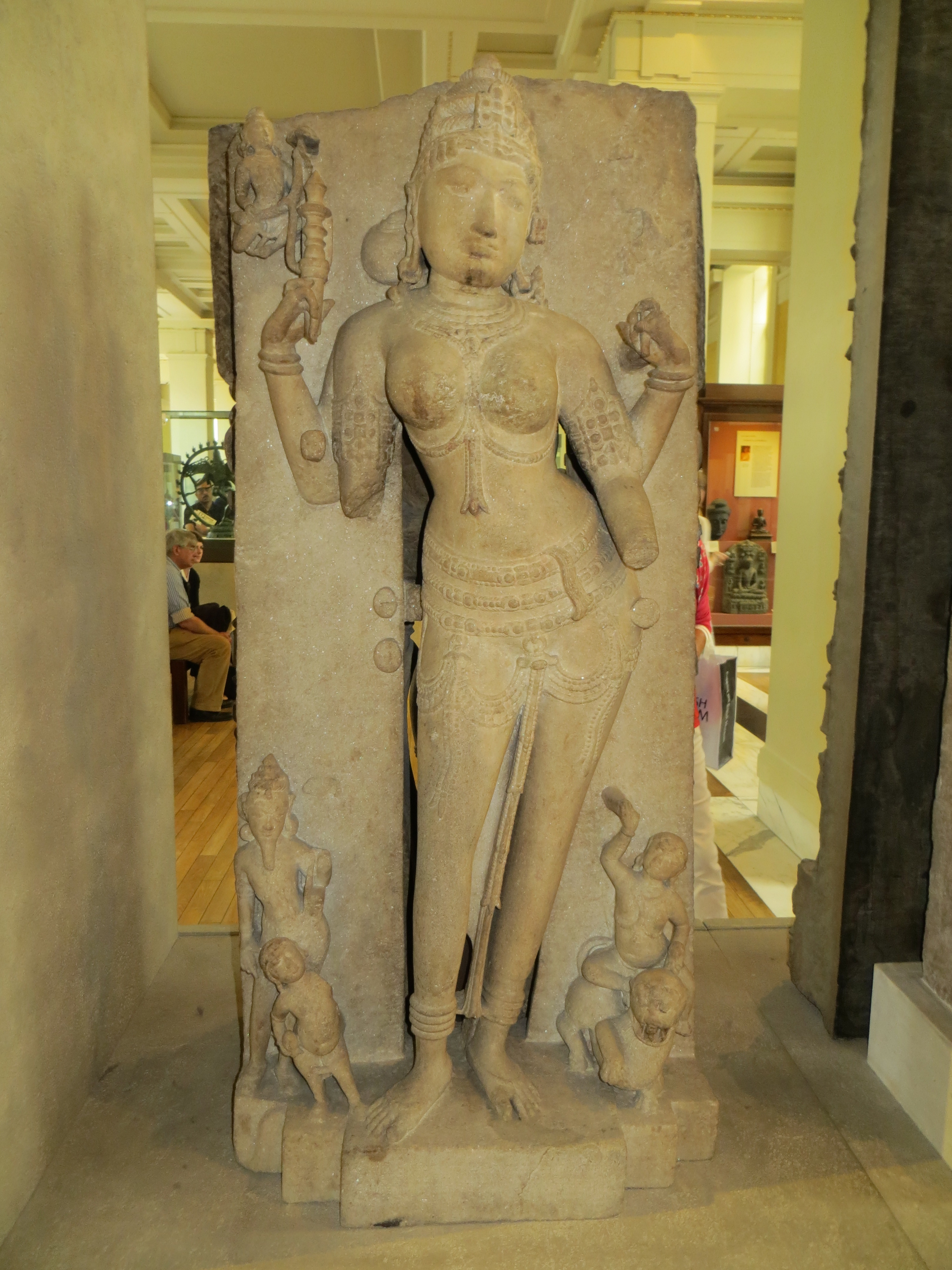
Sculpture of Goddess Ambika found at Dhar, India, 1034 AD

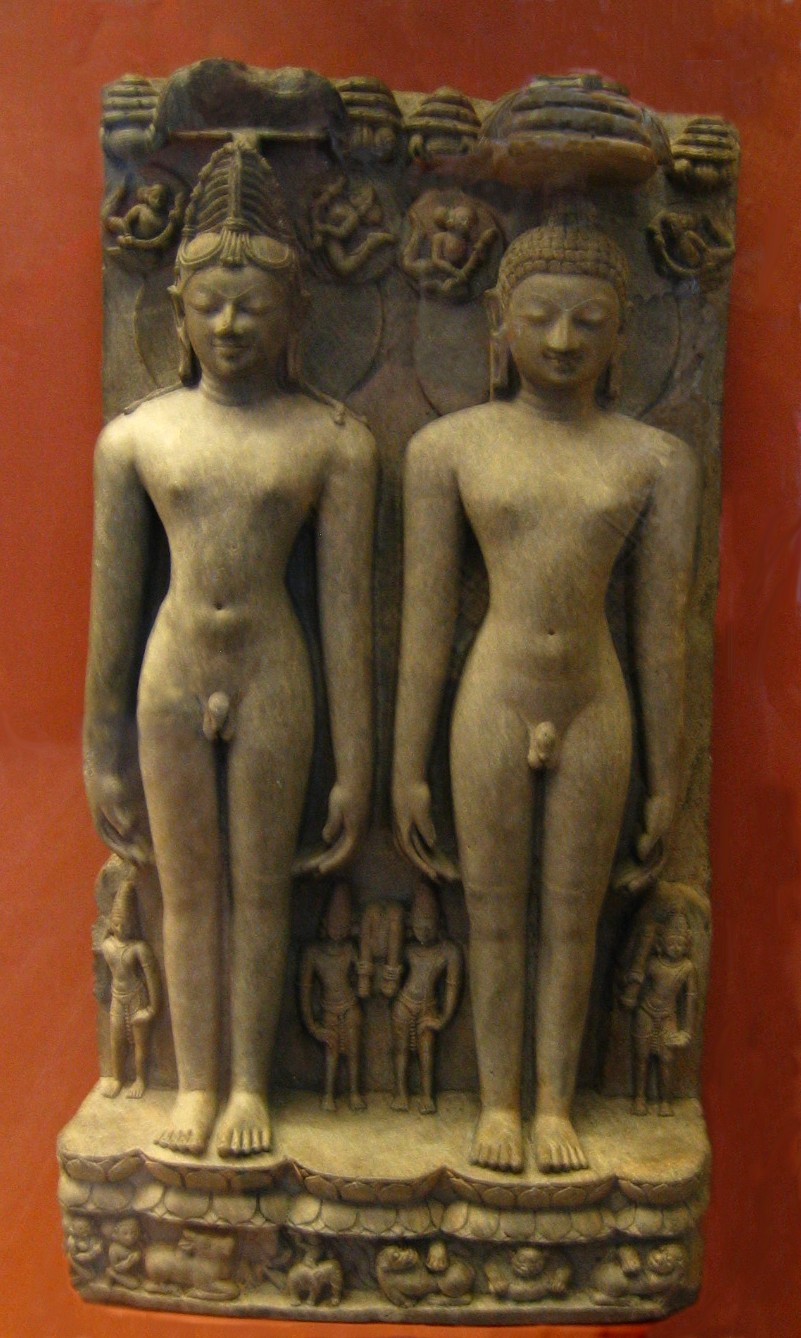
Sculpture of the two Jain tirthankaras Rishabhanatha and Mahavira, Orissa, India, 11th–12th century AD

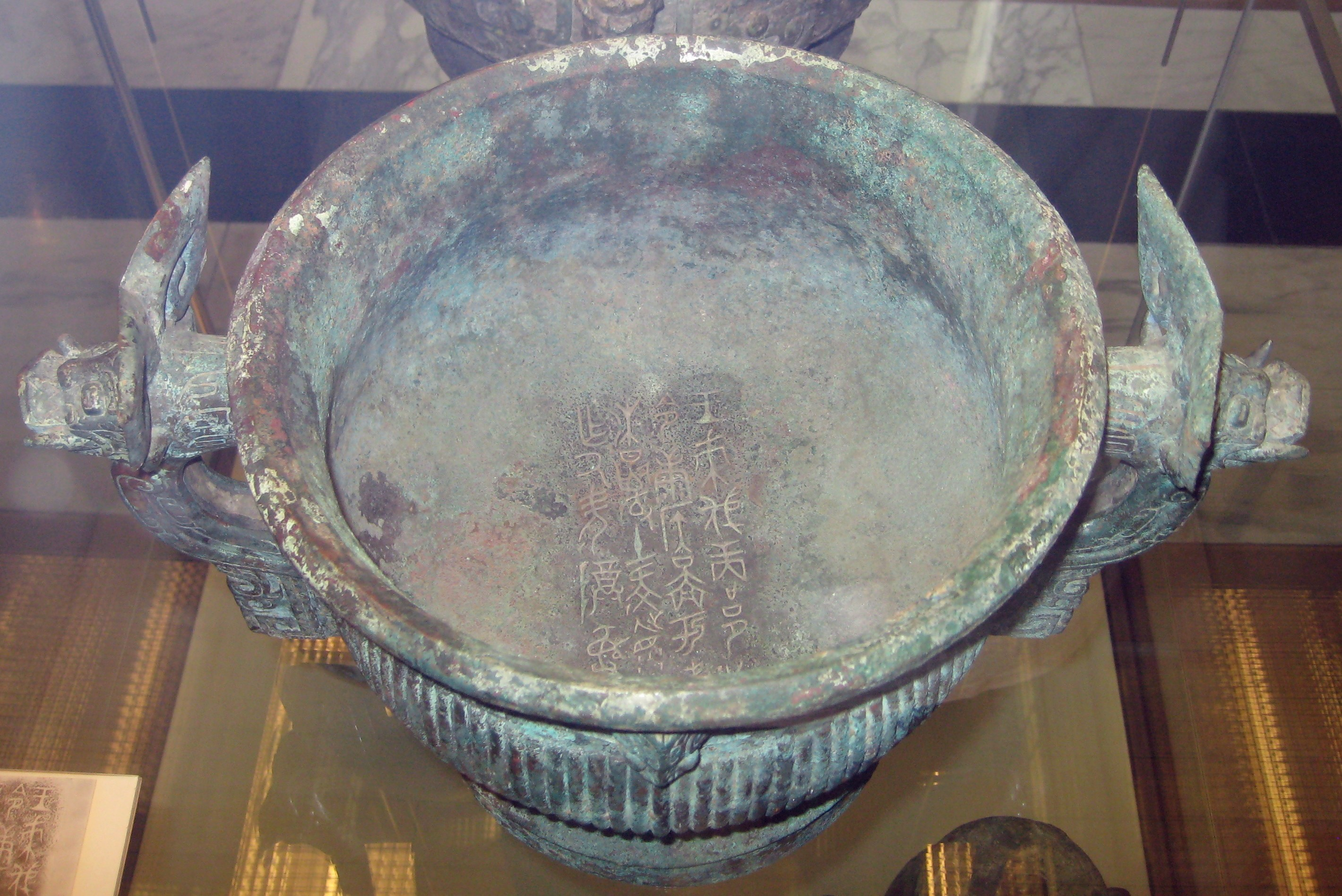
Room 33 – Western Zhou bronze ritual vessel known as the "Kang Hou Gui", China, 11th century BC

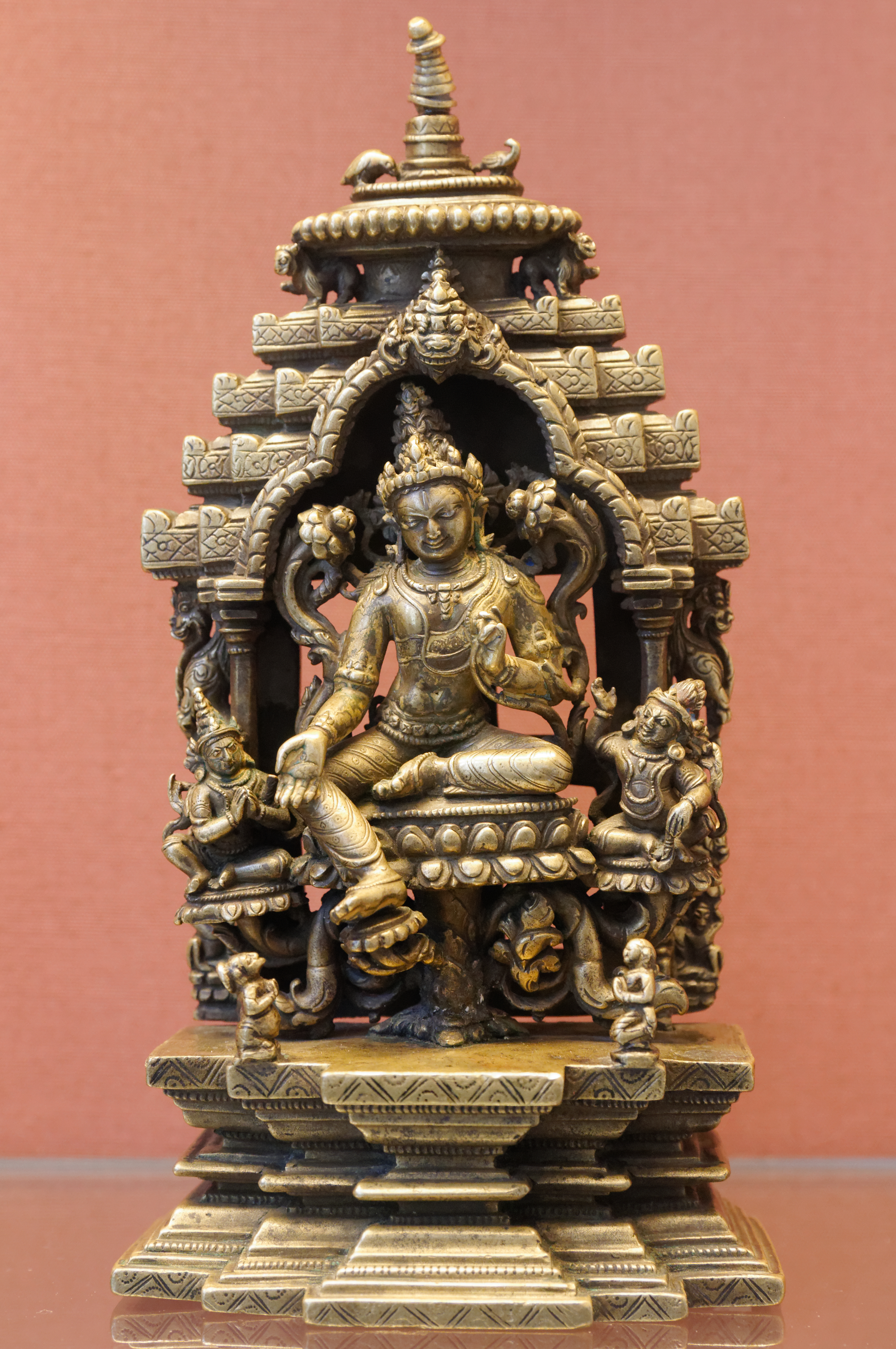
Room 33 – A crowned figure of the Bodhisattva Khasarpana Avalokiteśvara, India, 12th century AD

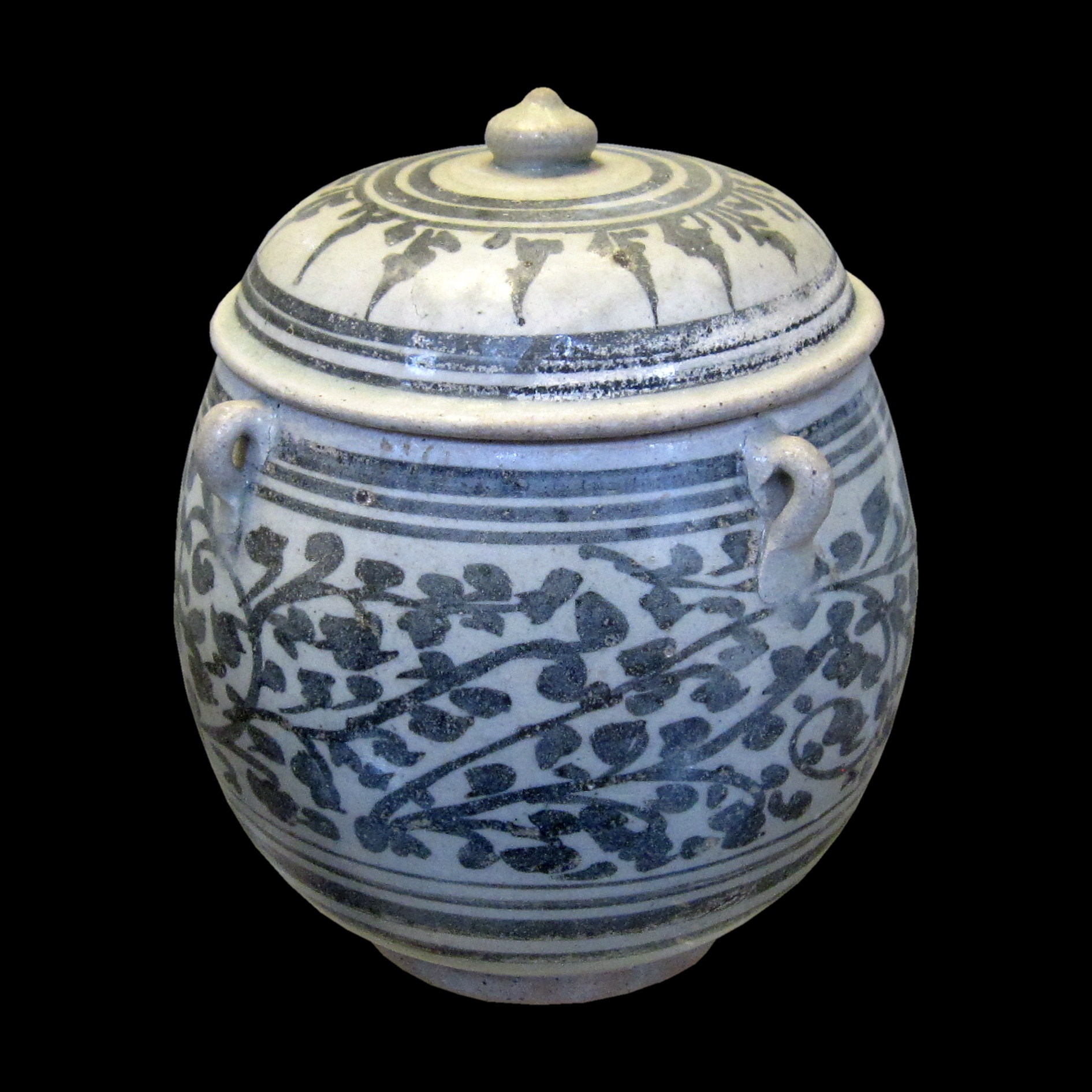
Room 33 – Covered hanging jar with underglaze decoration, Si Satchanalai (Sawankalok), north-central Thailand, 14th–16th centuries AD

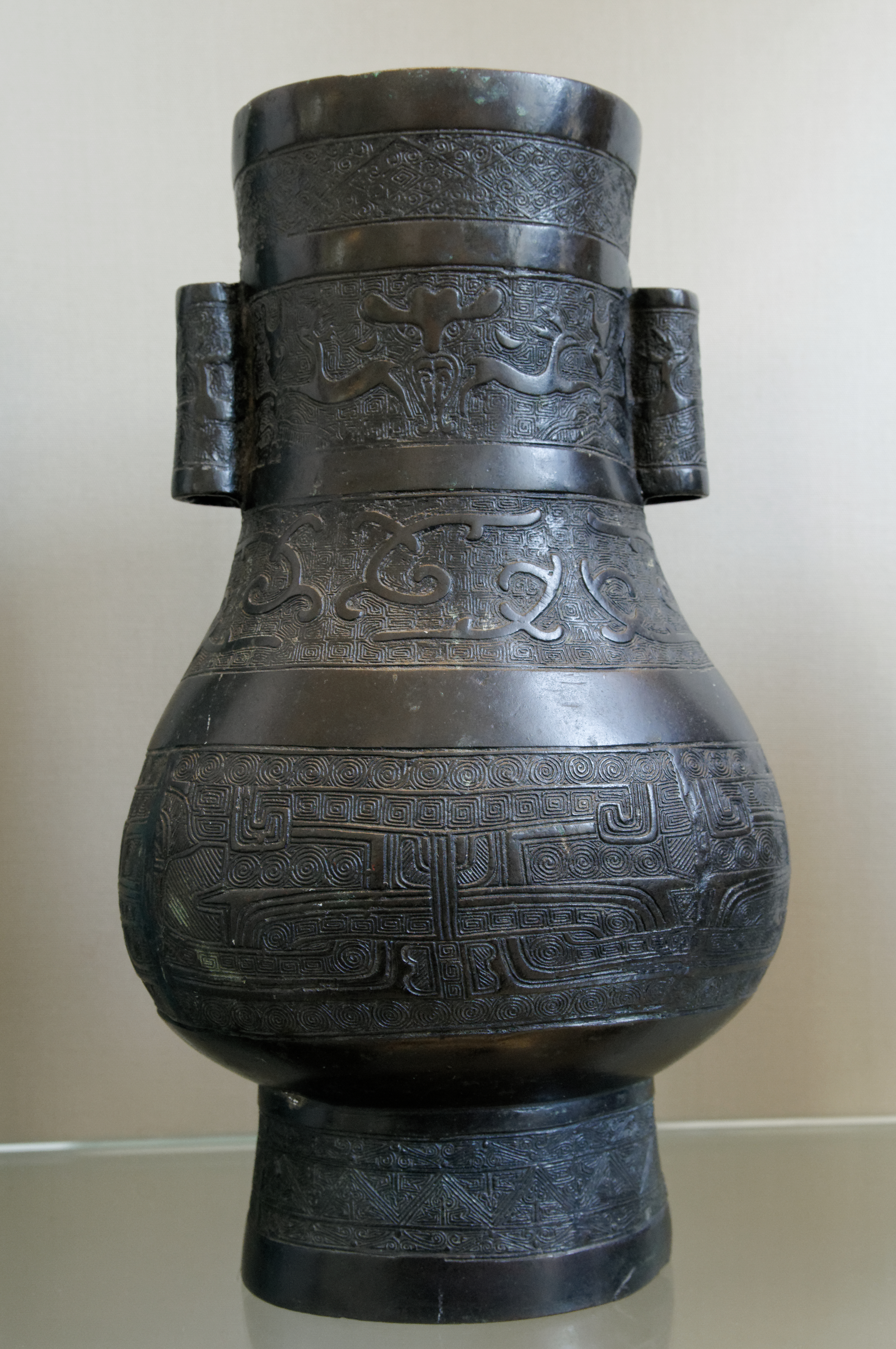
Room 33 – Hu-shaped altar flower vessel, Ming dynasty, China, 15th–16th centuries AD

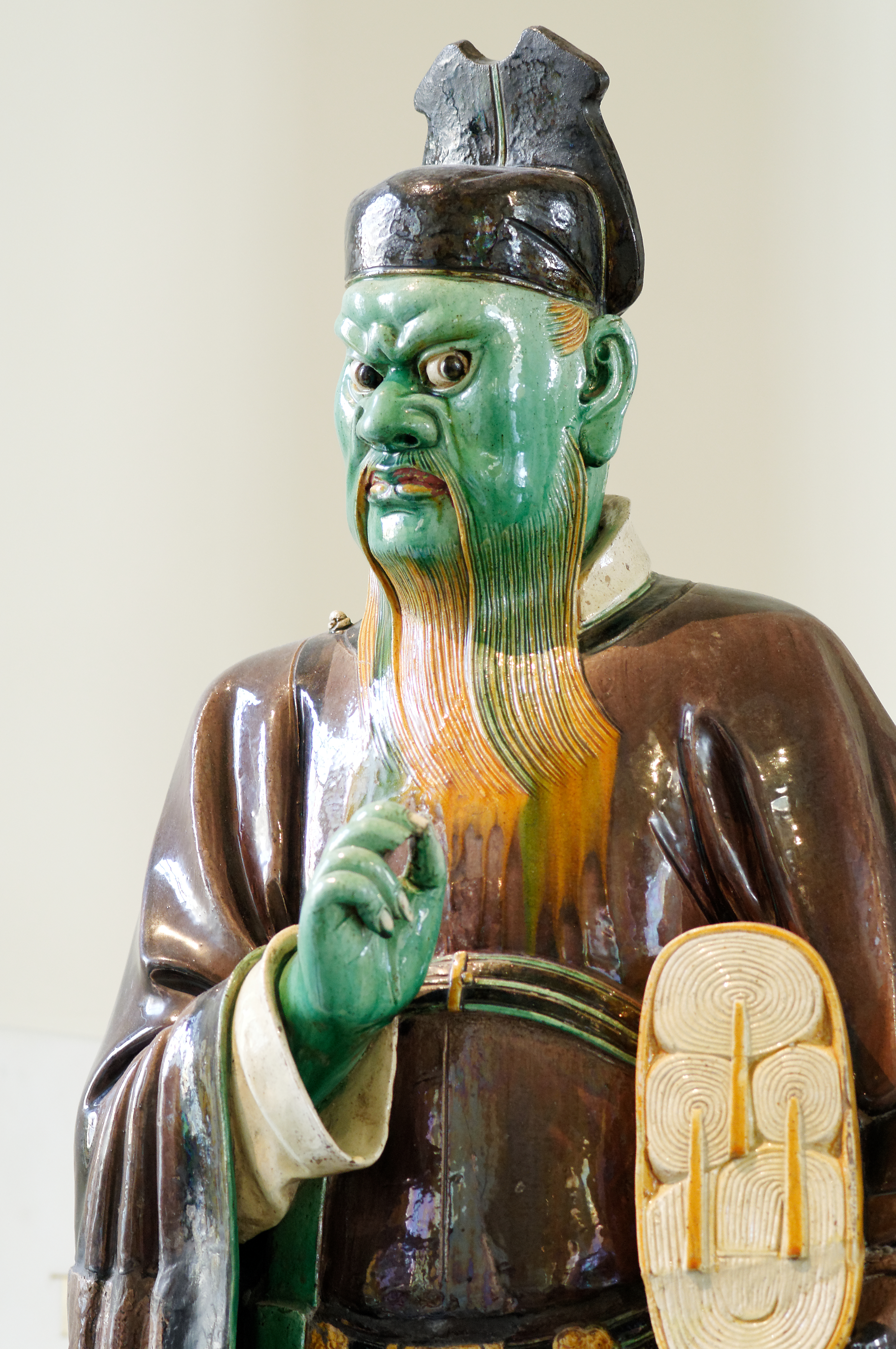
Room 33 – An assistant to the Judge of Hell, figure from a judgement group, Ming dynasty, China, 16th century AD

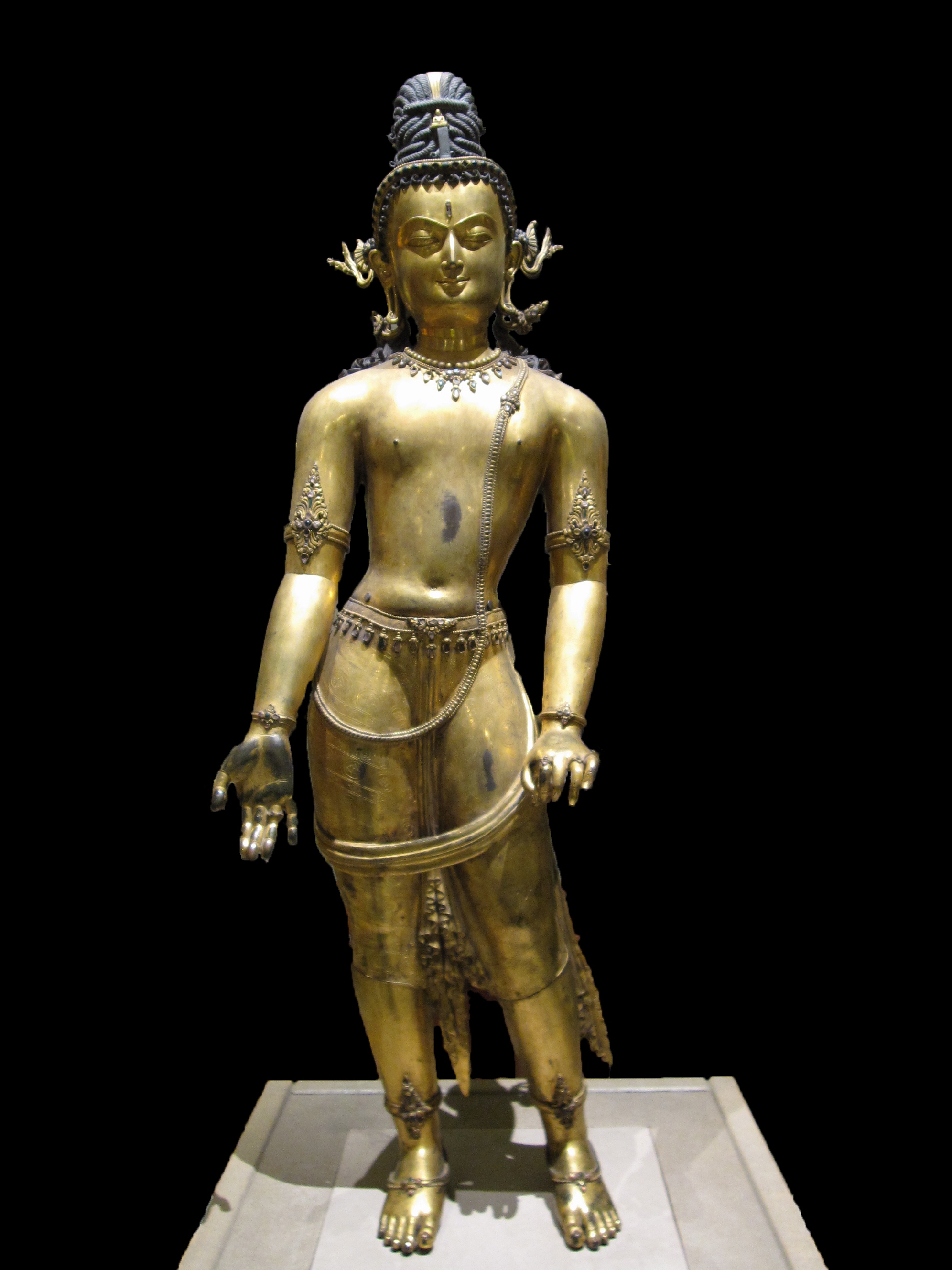
Room 33 – Statue of Bodhisattva Avalokiteshvara, gilded bronze. Nepal, 16th century AD

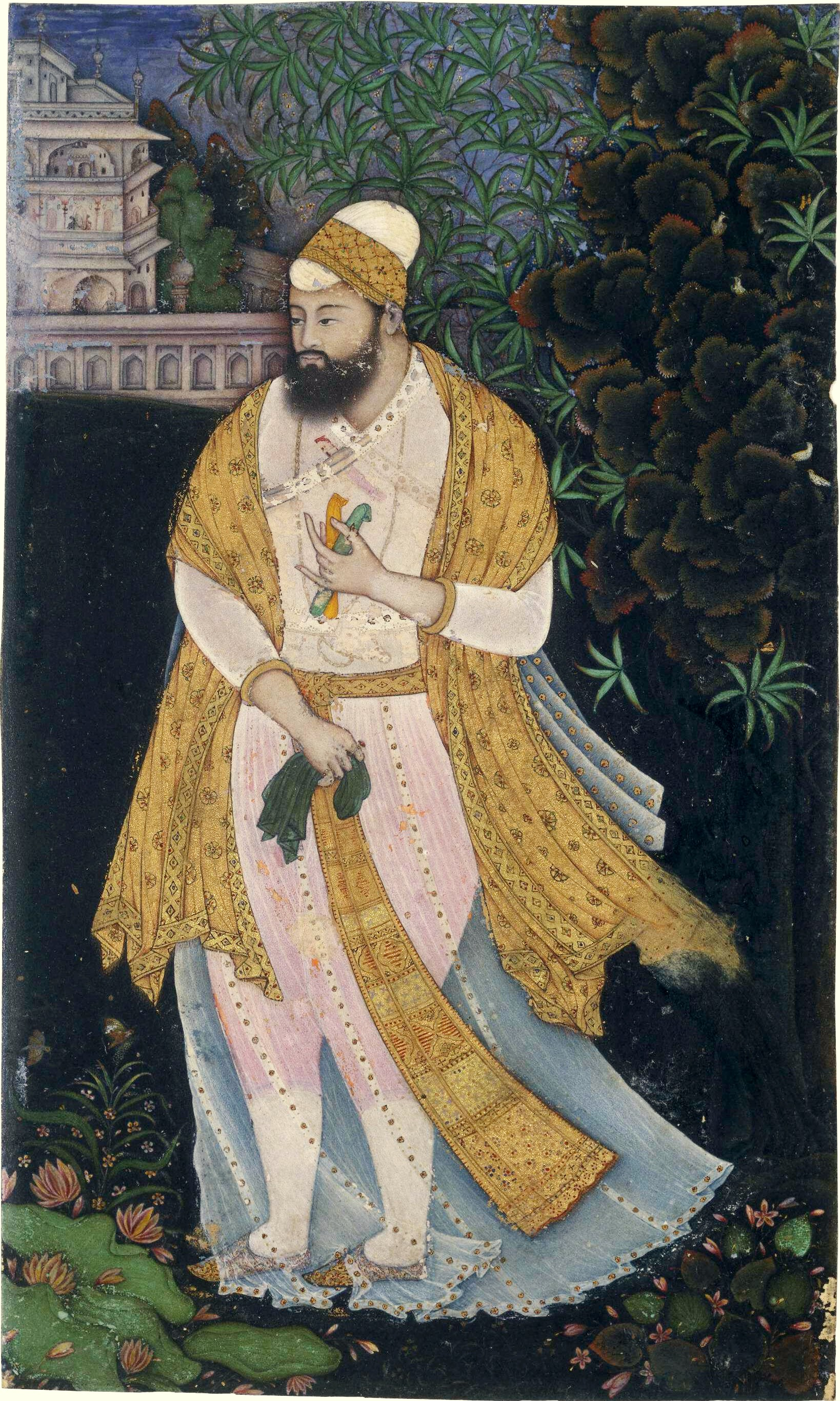
Portrait of Ibrahim Adil Shah II (1580–1626), India, 1615 AD

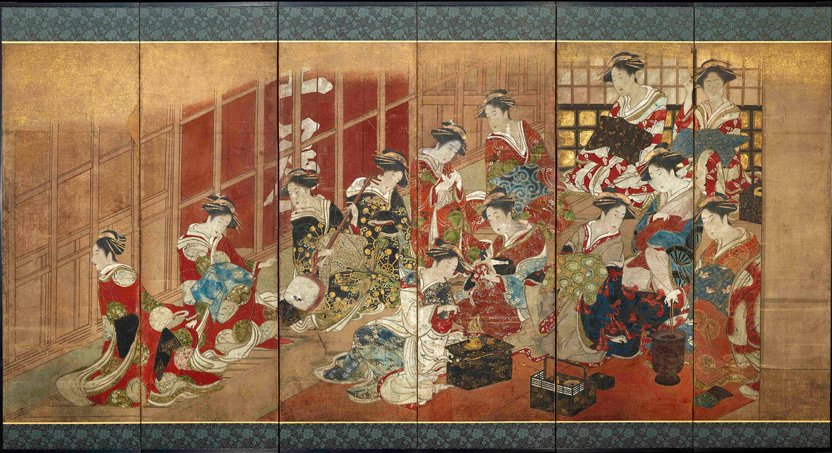
Room 90 – Courtesans of the Tamaya House, attributed to Utagawa Toyoharu, screen painting; Japan, Edo period, late 1770s or early 1780s AD

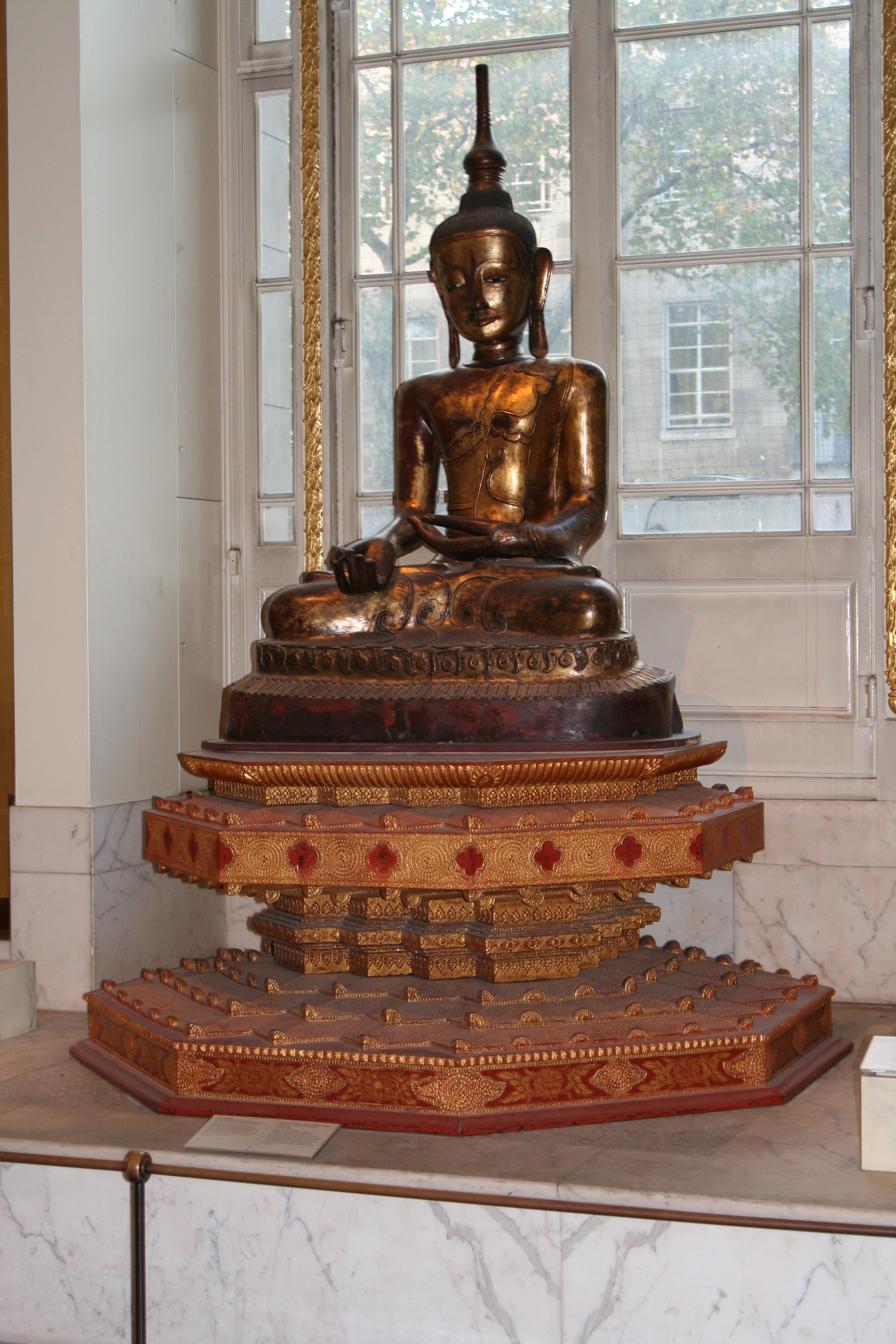
Room 33 – Large statue of Buddha made of lacquer from Burma, 18th–19th century AD

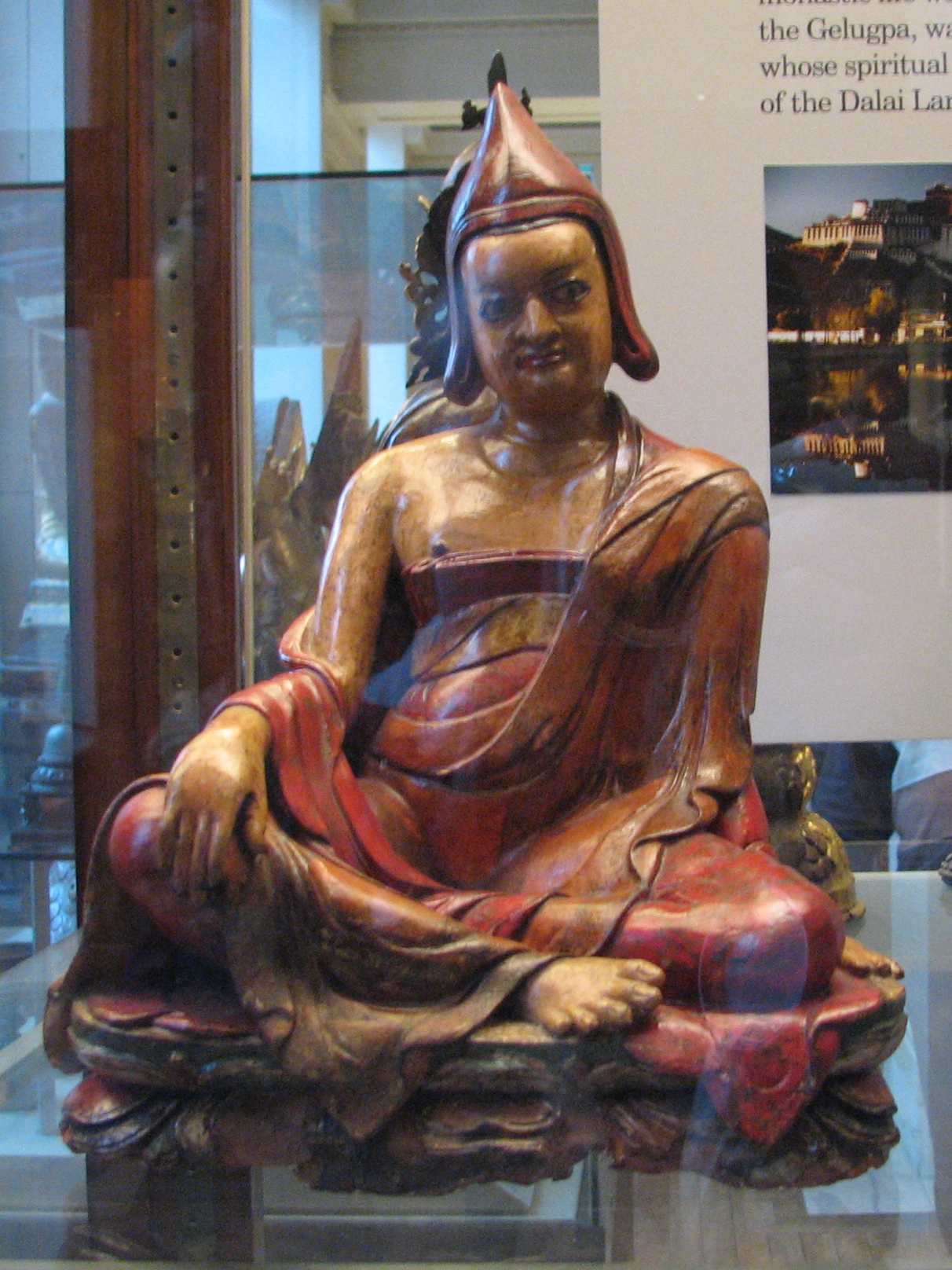
Room 33 – Figure of seated Lama; of painted and varnished papier-mâché, Ladakh, India, 19th century AD

=== Department of Africa, Oceania and the Americas ===
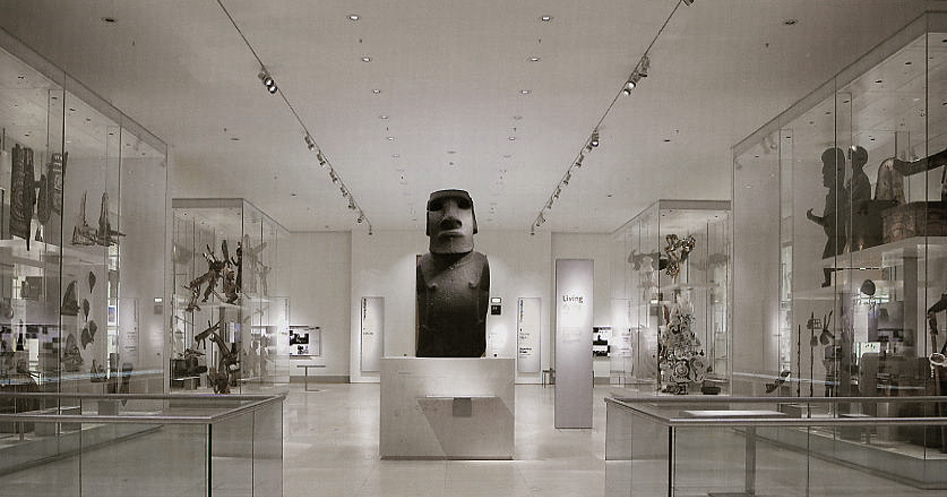
Room 24 – The Wellcome Trust Gallery of Living and Dying, with Hoa Hakananai'a, a moai, in the centre

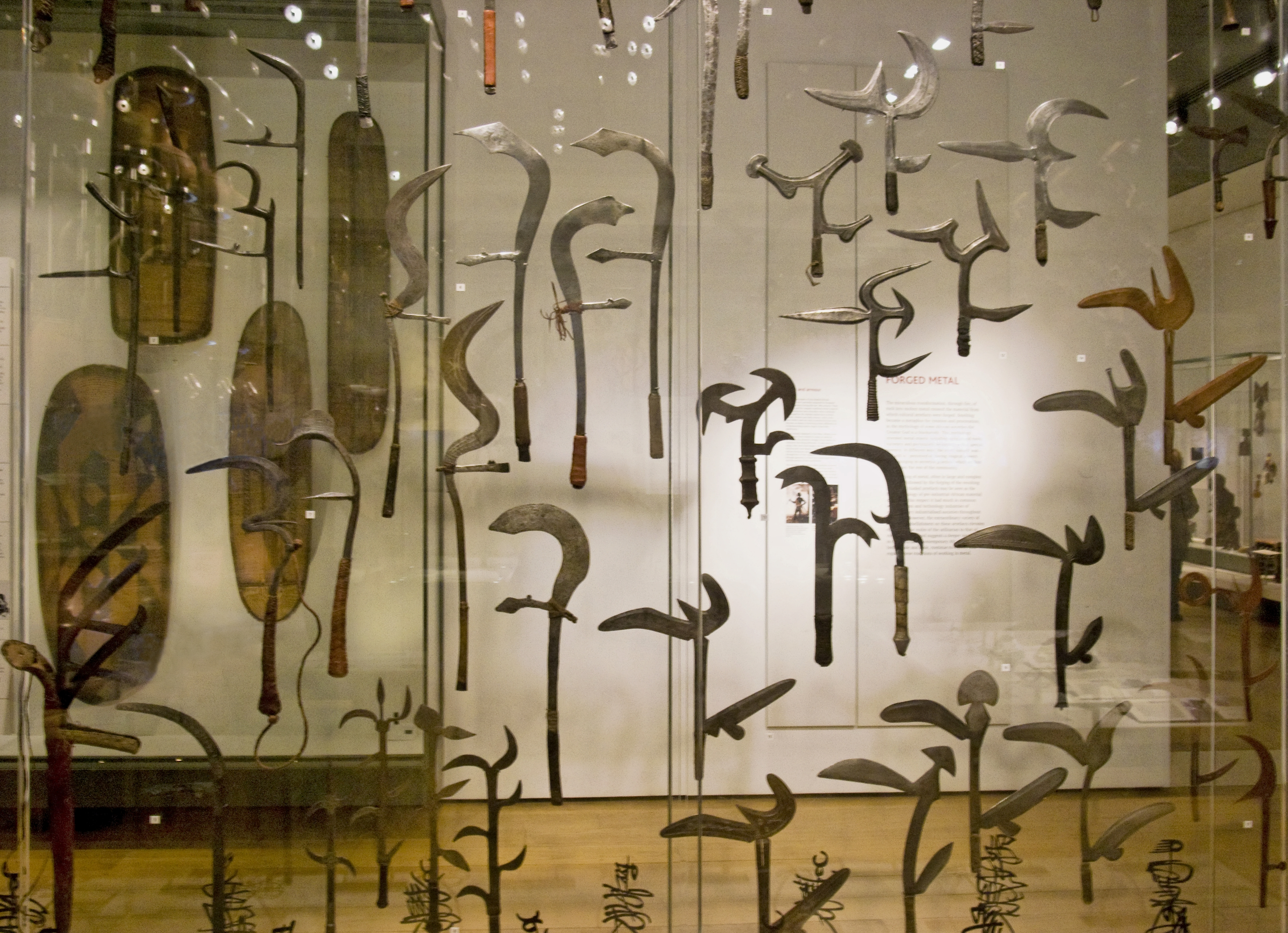
Room 25 – A collection of African throwing knives

The British Museum houses one of the world's most comprehensive collections of ethnographic material from Africa, Oceania and the Americas, representing the cultures of indigenous peoples throughout the world. Over 350,000 objects spanning thousands of years tells the history of mankind from three major continents and many rich and diverse cultures; the collecting of modern artefacts is ongoing. Many individuals have added to the department's collection over the years but those assembled by Henry Christy, Harry Beasley and William Oldman are outstanding.

Objects from this department are mostly on display in several galleries on the ground and lower floors. Gallery 24 displays ethnographic from every continent while adjacent galleries focus on North America and Mexico. A long suite of rooms (Gallery 25) on the lower floor display African art. There are plans in place to develop permanent galleries for displaying art from Oceania and South America.

==== Africa ====
The Sainsbury African Galleries display 600 objects from the museum's permanent collection of African arts and culture. The three permanent galleries provide a very large exhibition space for the museum's African collection comprising over 200,000 objects. The curatorial scope encompasses both archaeological and contemporary material, including both masterpieces of artistry and objects of everyday life. An important addition was material amassed by Sir Henry Wellcome, which was donated by the Wellcome Historical Medical Museum in 1954.

Highlights of the African collection include objects found at megalithic circles in The Gambia, a dozen exquisite Afro-Portuguese ivories, a series of soapstone figures from the Kissi people in Sierra Leone and Liberia, hoard of bronze Kru currency rings from the Sinoe River in Liberia, Asante goldwork and regalia from Ghana including the Bowdich collection, the rare Akan Drum from the same region in west Africa, pair of door panels and lintel from the palace at Ikere-Ekiti in Yorubaland, the Benin Bronzes, taken during the Benin Expedition of 1897, and Igbo-Ukwu bronze sculptures, the beautiful Bronze Head of Queen Idia, a magnificent brass head of a Yoruba ruler and quartz throne from Ife, a similar terracotta head from Iwinrin Grove near Ife, the Apapa Hoard from Lagos and other mediaeval bronze hoards from Allabia and the Forçados River in southern Nigeria.

Included is an Ikom monolith from Cross River State, several ancestral screens from the Kalabari tribe in the Niger Delta, the Torday collection of central African sculpture, textiles and weaponry from the Kuba Kingdom including three royal figures, the unique Luzira Head from Uganda, processional crosses and other ecclesiastical and royal material from Gondar and Magdala, Ethiopia taken following the British Expedition to Abyssinia, excavated objects from Great Zimbabwe (that includes a unique soapstone anthropomorphic figure) and satellite towns such as Mutare including a large hoard of Iron Age soapstone figures, a rare divining bowl from the Venda peoples, and cave paintings and petroglyphs from South Africa.

==== Oceania ====
The British Museum's Oceanic collections originate from the vast area of the Pacific Ocean, stretching from Papua New Guinea to Easter Island, from New Zealand to Hawaii. The three main anthropological groups represented in the collection are Polynesia, Melanesia and Micronesia – Aboriginal art from Australia is considered separately in its own right. Metal working was not indigenous to Oceania before Europeans arrived, so many of the artefacts from the collection are made from stone, shell, bone and bamboo. Prehistoric objects from the region include a bird-shaped pestle and a group of stone mortars from Papua New Guinea.

The British Museum is fortunate in having some of the earliest Oceanic and Pacific collections, many of which were put together by members of Cook's and Vancouver's expeditions or by colonial administrators and explorers such as Sir George Grey, Sir Frederick Broome, Joseph Bradshaw, Robert Christison, Gregory Mathews, Frederick Meinertzhagen, Thomas Mitchell and Arthur Gordon, before Western culture significantly impacted on indigenous cultures. The department has also benefited greatly from the legacy of pioneering anthropologists such as A. C. Haddon, Bronisław Malinowski and Katherine Routledge. An important artefact is a wooden Aboriginal shield, probably dating from the late eighteenth century and one of the earliest precontact objects from Australia.

The Wilson cabinet of curiosities from Palau is an example of pre-contact ware. Another outstanding exemplar is the mourner's dress from Tahiti given to Cook on his second voyage, one of only ten in existence. In the collection is a large war canoe from the island of Vella Lavella in the Solomon Islands, one of the last ever to be built in the archipelago.

The Māori collection is the finest outside New Zealand with many intricately carved wooden and jade objects and the Aboriginal art collection is distinguished by its wide range of bark paintings, including two very early bark etchings collected by John Hunter Kerr. A particularly important group of objects was purchased from the London Missionary Society in 1911, that includes the unique statue of A'a from Rurutu Island, the rare idol from the isle of Mangareva and the Cook Islands deity figure. Other highlights include the huge Hawaiian statue of Kū-ka-ili-moku or god of war (one of three extant in the world) and the famous Easter Island statues Hoa Hakananai'a and Moai Hava.

The museum does not have a dedicated Oceania Gallery.

==== Americas ====
The Americas collection mainly consists of 19th and 20th century items although the Paracas, Moche, Inca, Maya, Aztec, Taino and other early cultures are well represented. The Kayung totem pole, which was made in the late nineteenth century on Haida Gwaii, dominates the Great Court and provides a introduction to this very wide-ranging collection that stretches from the very north of the North American continent where the Inuit population has lived for centuries, to the tip of South America where indigenous tribes have long thrived in Patagonia.

Highlights of the collection include Aboriginal Canadian and Native American objects from North America collected by the 5th Earl of Lonsdale, the Marquis of Lorne, the explorer David Haig-Thomas and Bryan Mullanphy, Mayor of St. Louis, the Squier and Davis collection of prehistoric mound relics from North America, two carved stone bowls in the form of a seated human figure made by ancient North West Coast peoples from British Columbia, the headdress of Chief Yellow Calf from the Arapaho tribe in Wyoming, a lidded rivercane basket from South Carolina and the earliest historic example of Cherokee basketry, a selection of pottery vessels found in prehistoric dwellings at Mesa Verde and Casas Grandes, one of the enigmatic crystal skulls of unknown origin, a collection of nine turquoise Aztec mosaics from Mexico (the largest in Europe), important artefacts from Teotihuacan and Isla de Sacrificios.

There are several rare pre-Columbian manuscripts including the Codex Zouche-Nuttall and Codex Waecker-Gotter and post-colonial ones such as the Codex Aubin and Codex Kingsborough, a series of Mayan lintels from Yaxchilan excavated by the British Mayanist Alfred Maudslay, a Mayan collection that includes sculptures from Copan, Tikal, Tulum, Pusilha, Naranjo and Nebaj (including the celebrated Fenton Vase), an ornate calcite vase with jaguar handles from the Ulua Valley in Honduras, the Lord Moyne collection from the Bay Islands, Honduras and Boyle collection from Nicaragua, over 20 stone metates with zoomorphic and anthropomorphic ornamentation from Costa Rica, a group of Zemi Figures from Vere, Jamaica, and wooden duhos from the Dominican Republic and The Bahamas.

There are a collection of Pre-Columbian human mummies from sites across South America including Ancon, Acari, Arica and Leyva, a number of prestigious pre-Columbian gold and votive objects from Colombia, three axe-shaped gold diadems found near Camaná from the Siguas culture in Peru, unique collection of Moche wooden figures and staffs from the Macabi islands off Peru, ethnographic objects from across the Amazon region including the Schomburgk and Maybury Lewis collections and part of the von Martius and von Spix collection, two rare Tiwanaku pottery vessels from Lake Titicaca and important items from Tierra del Fuego donated by Commander Phillip Parker King.

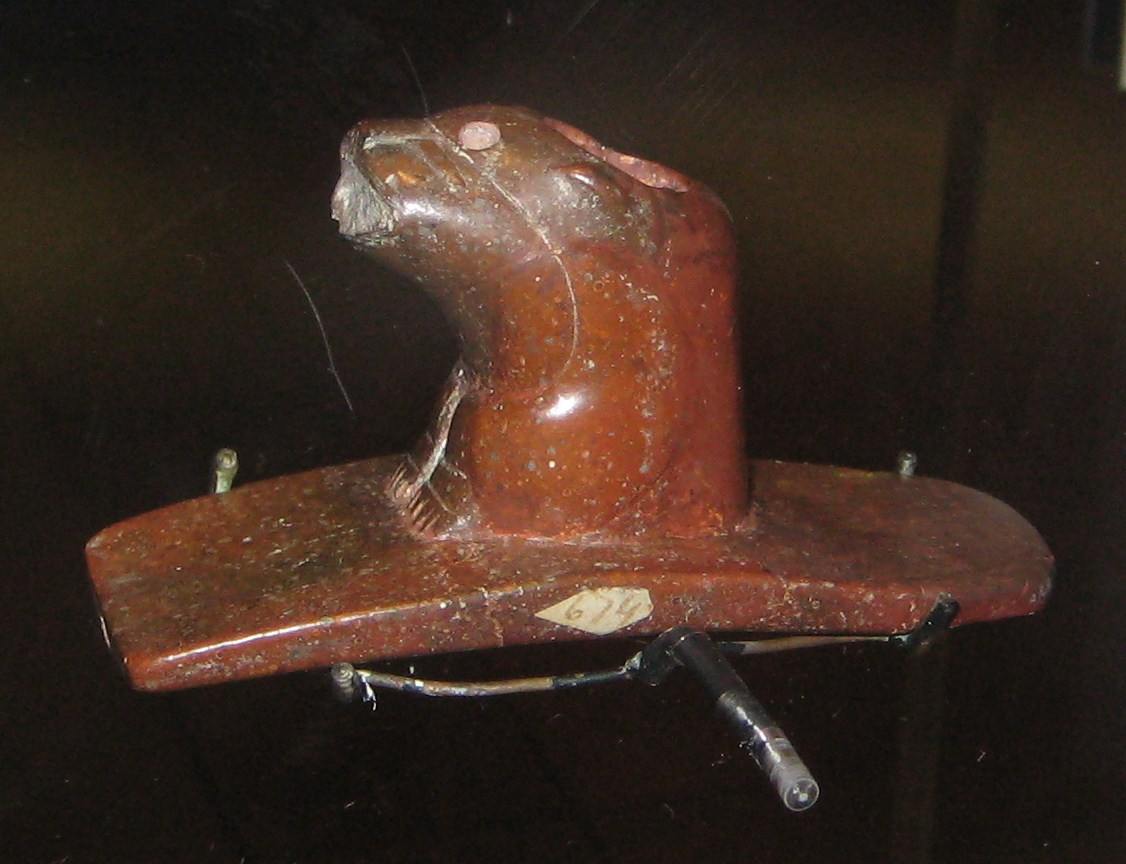
Room 26 – Stone pipe representing an otter from Mound City, Ohio, USA, 200 BC – 400 AD

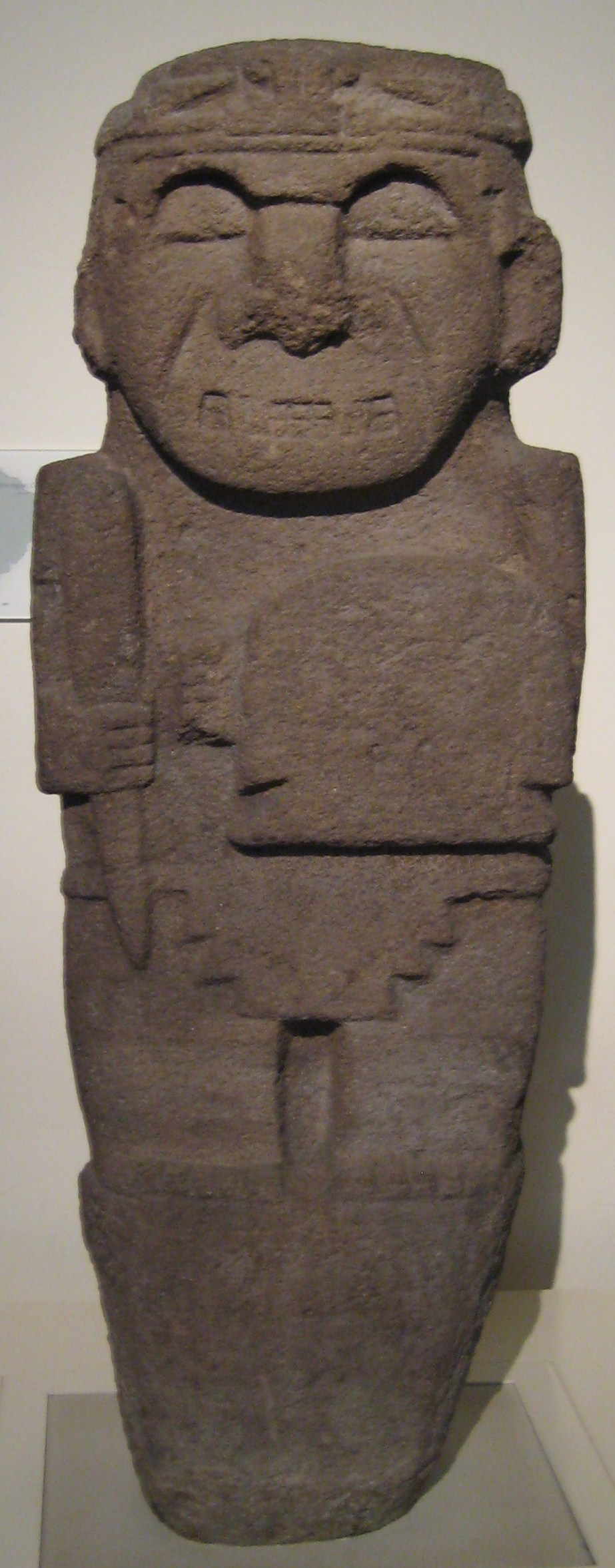
Room 2 – Stone tomb guardian, part human part jaguar, from San Agustín, Colombia, c. 300–600 AD

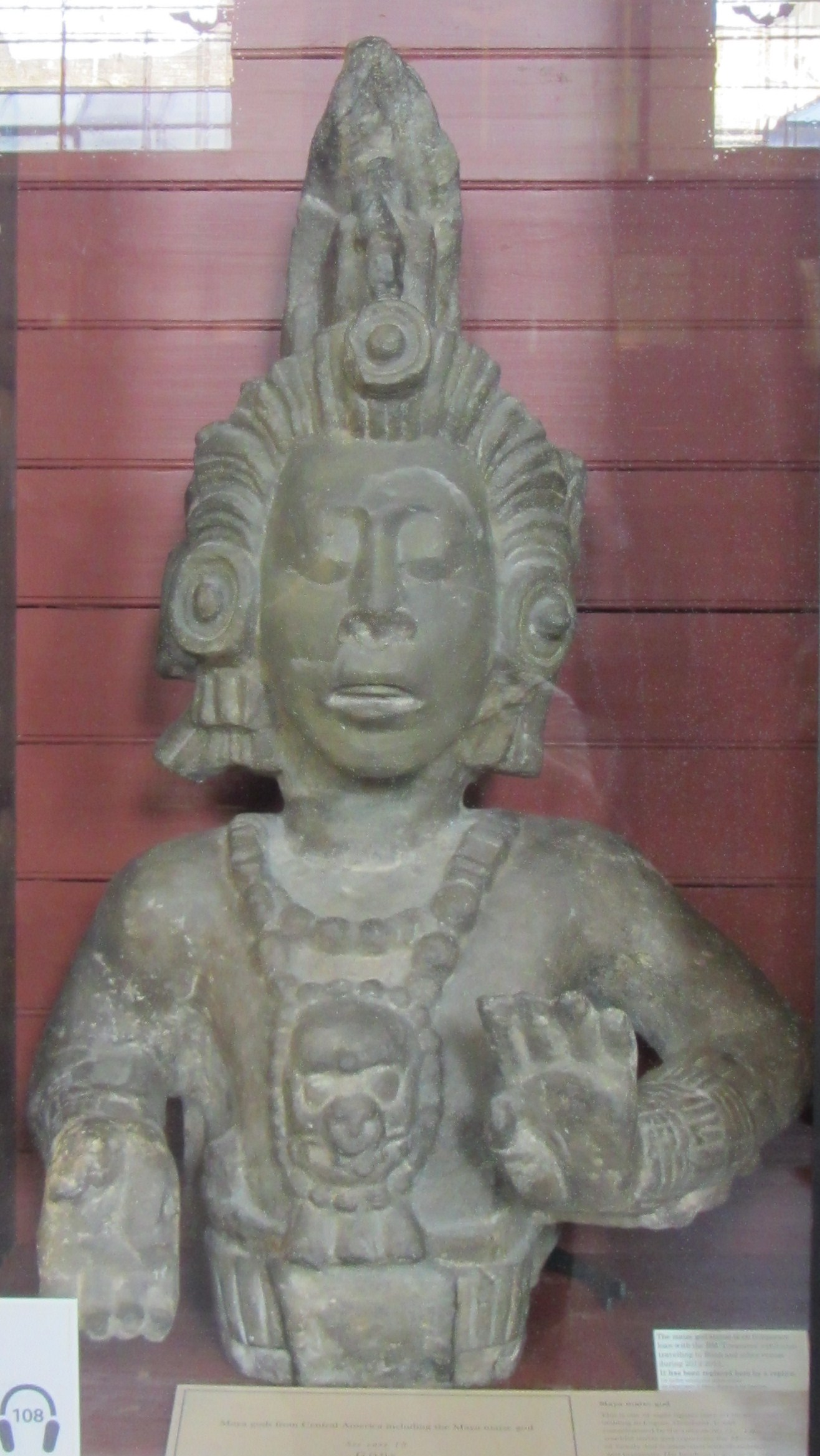
Room 1 – Maya maize god statue from Copán, Honduras, 600–800 AD

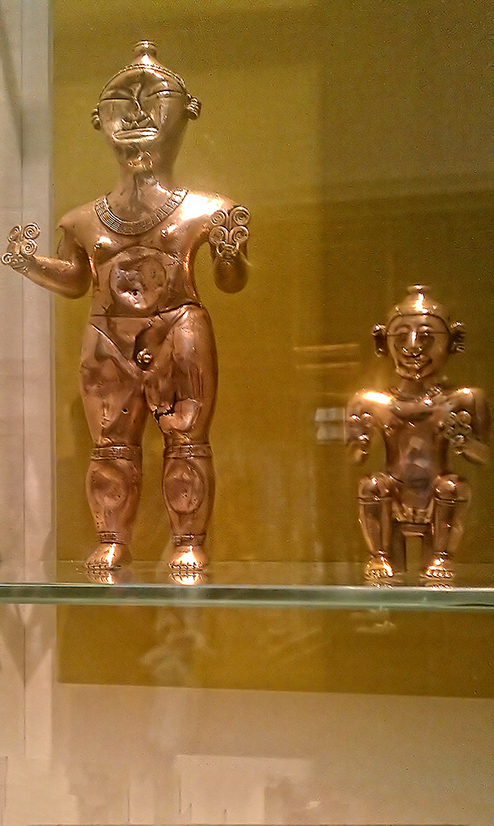
Room 24 – Gold Lime Flasks (poporos), Quimbaya Culture, Colombia, 600–1100 AD

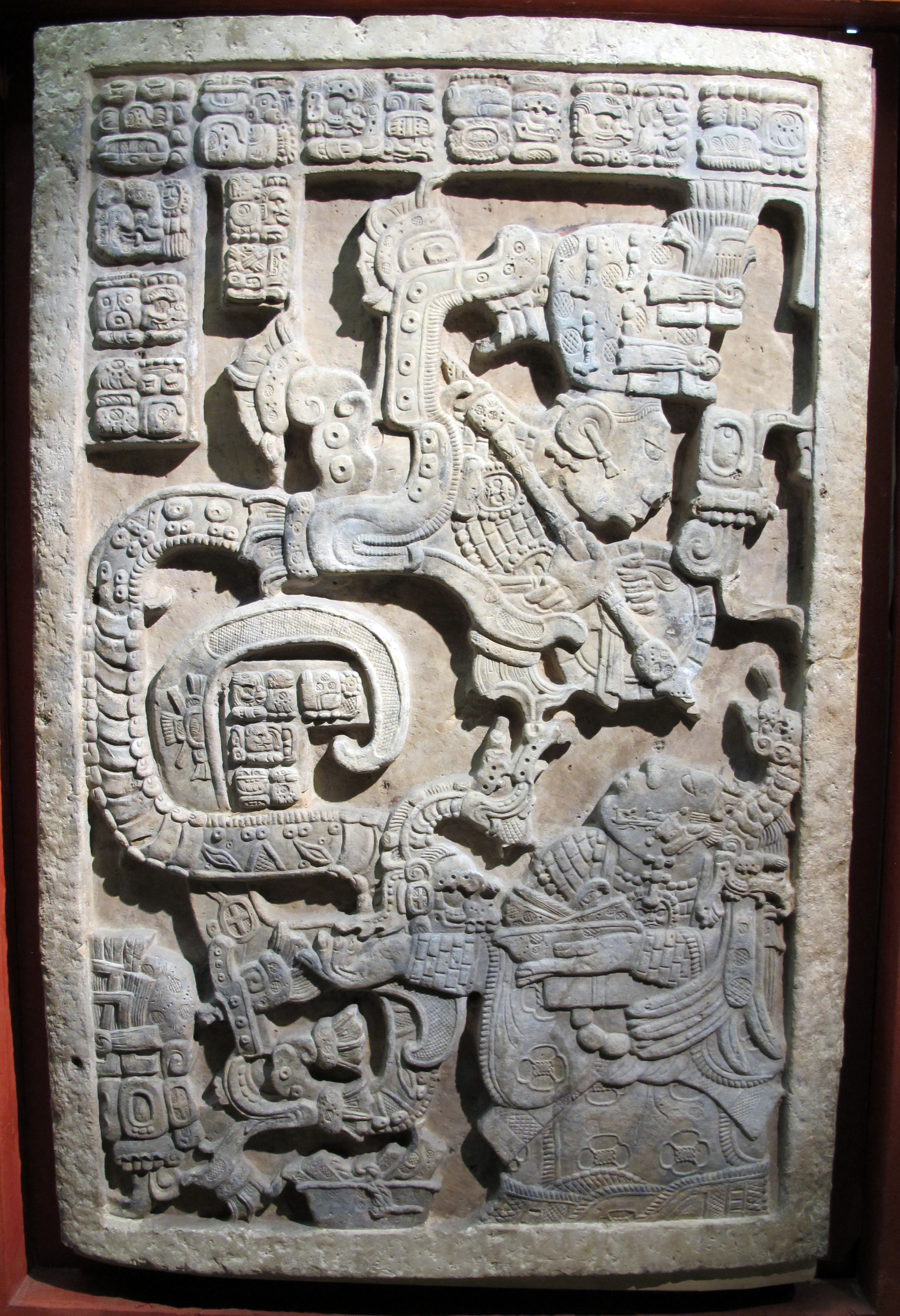
Room 27 – Lintel 25 from Yaxchilan, Late Classic, Mexico, 600–900 AD

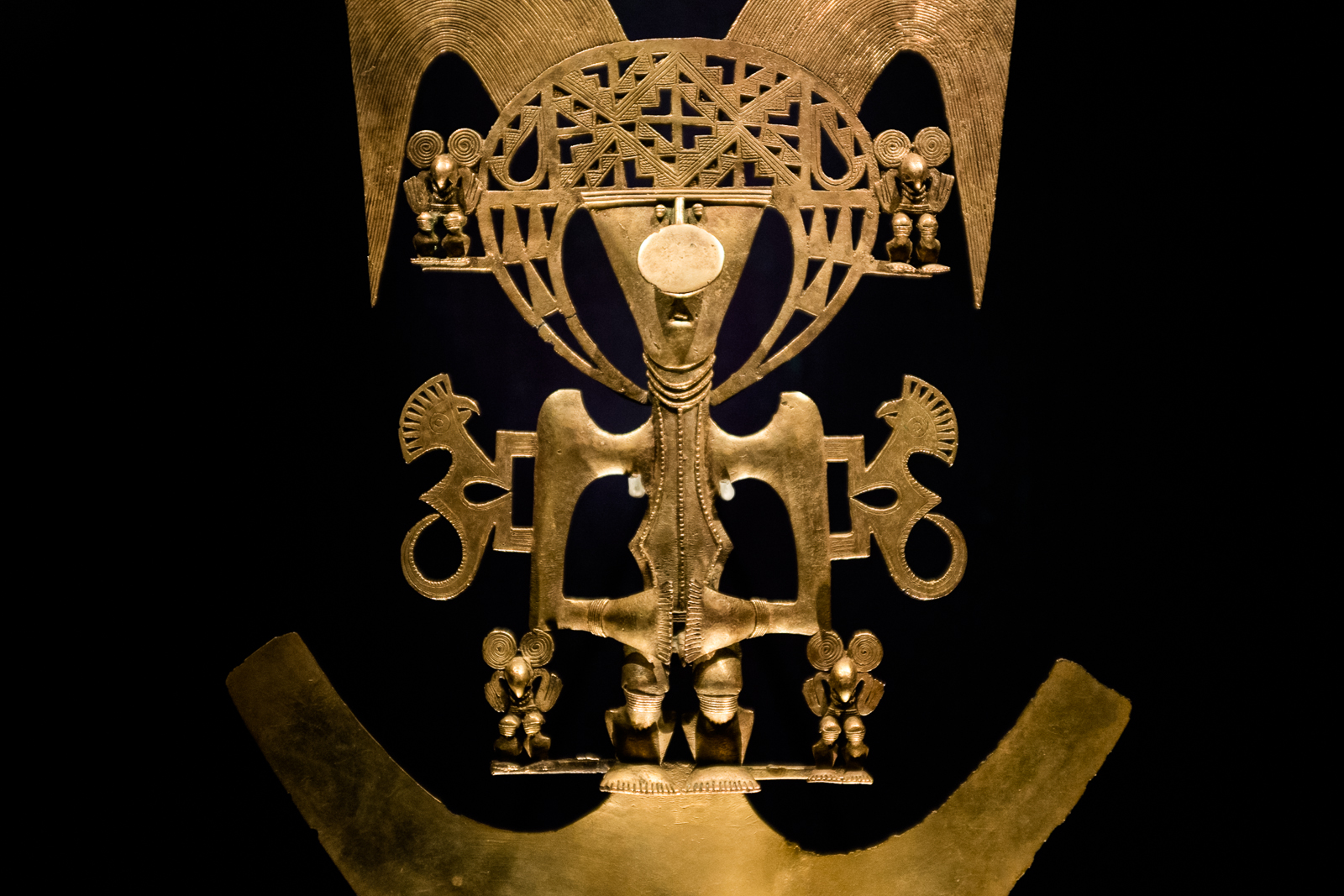
Room 24 – Bird pectoral made from gold alloy, Popayán, Colombia, 900–1600 AD

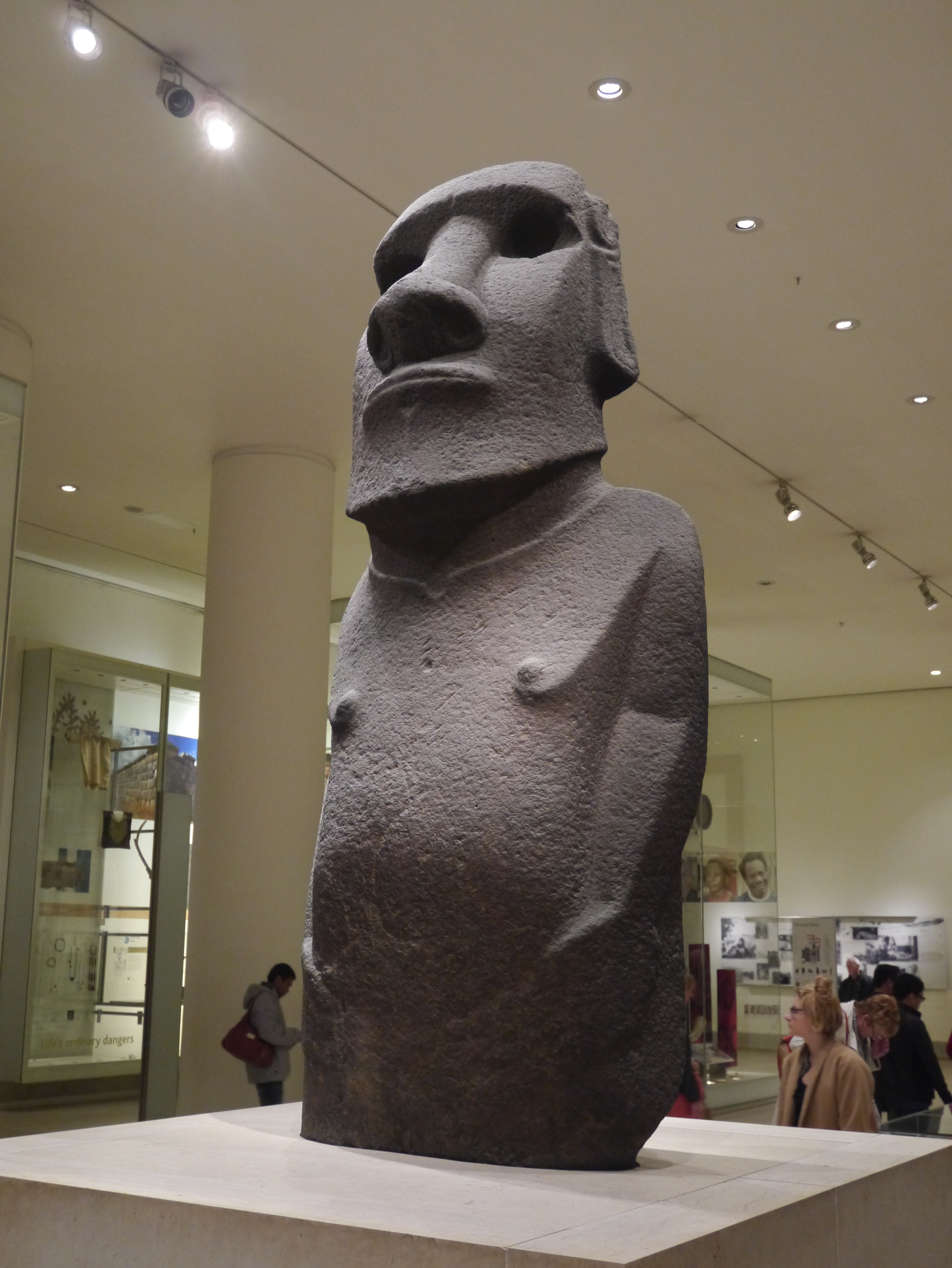
Room 24 – Rapa Nui statue Hoa Hakananai'a, 1000 AD, Wellcome Trust Gallery

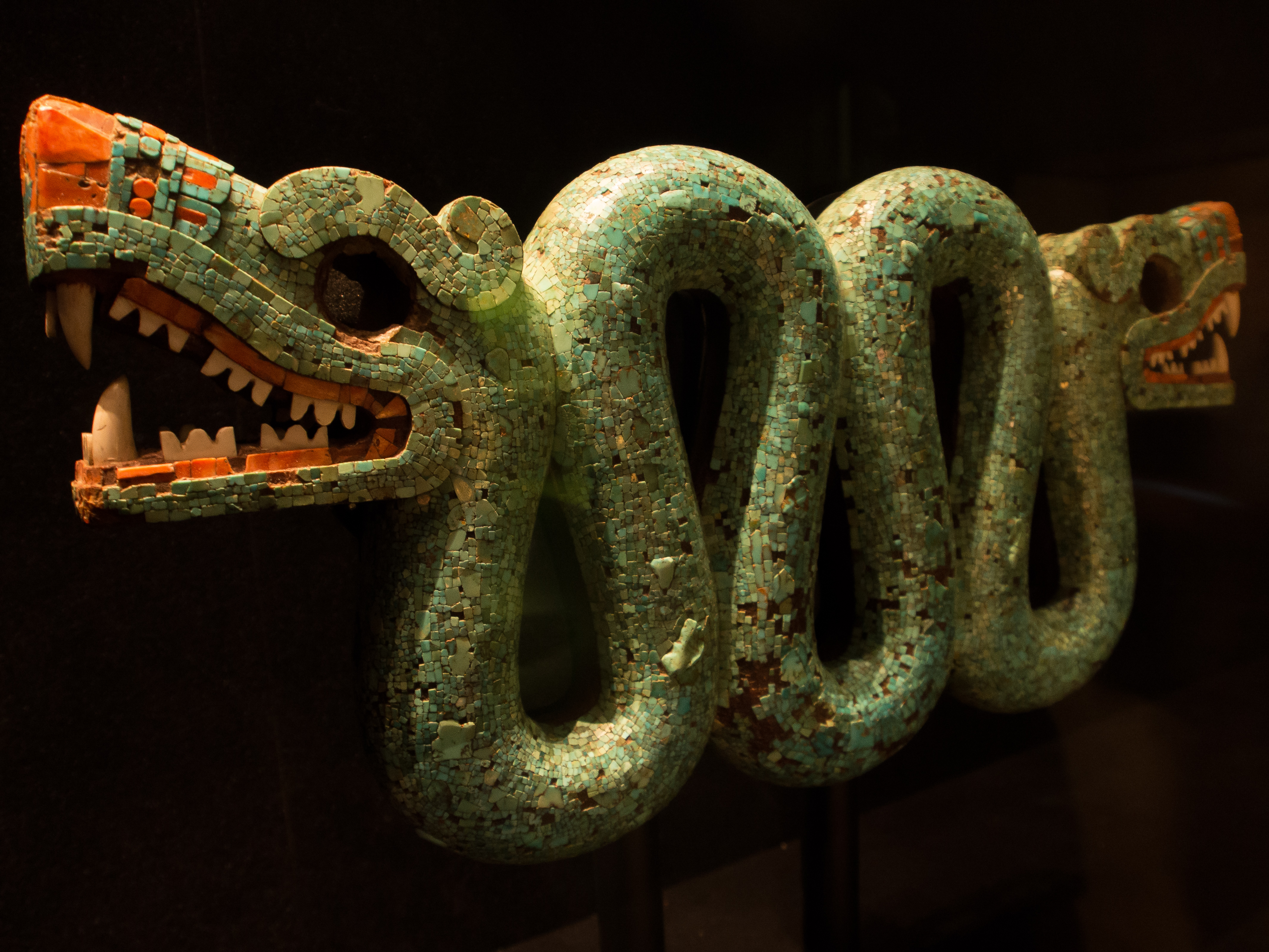
Room 27 – Double-headed serpent turquoise mosaic, Aztec, Mexico, 1400–1500 AD

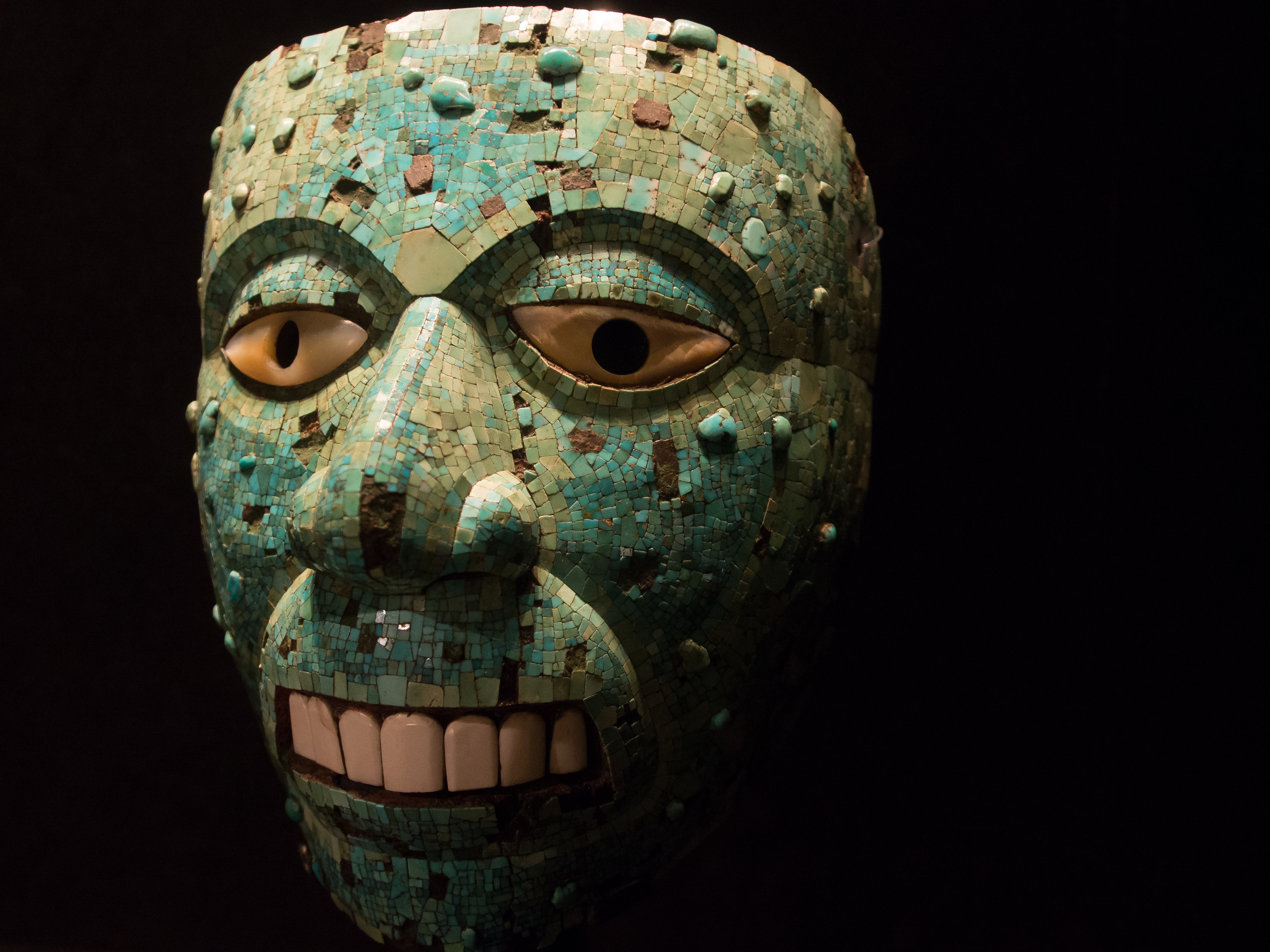
Room 27 – Turquoise Mosaic Mask, Mixtec-Aztec, Mexico, 1400–1500 AD

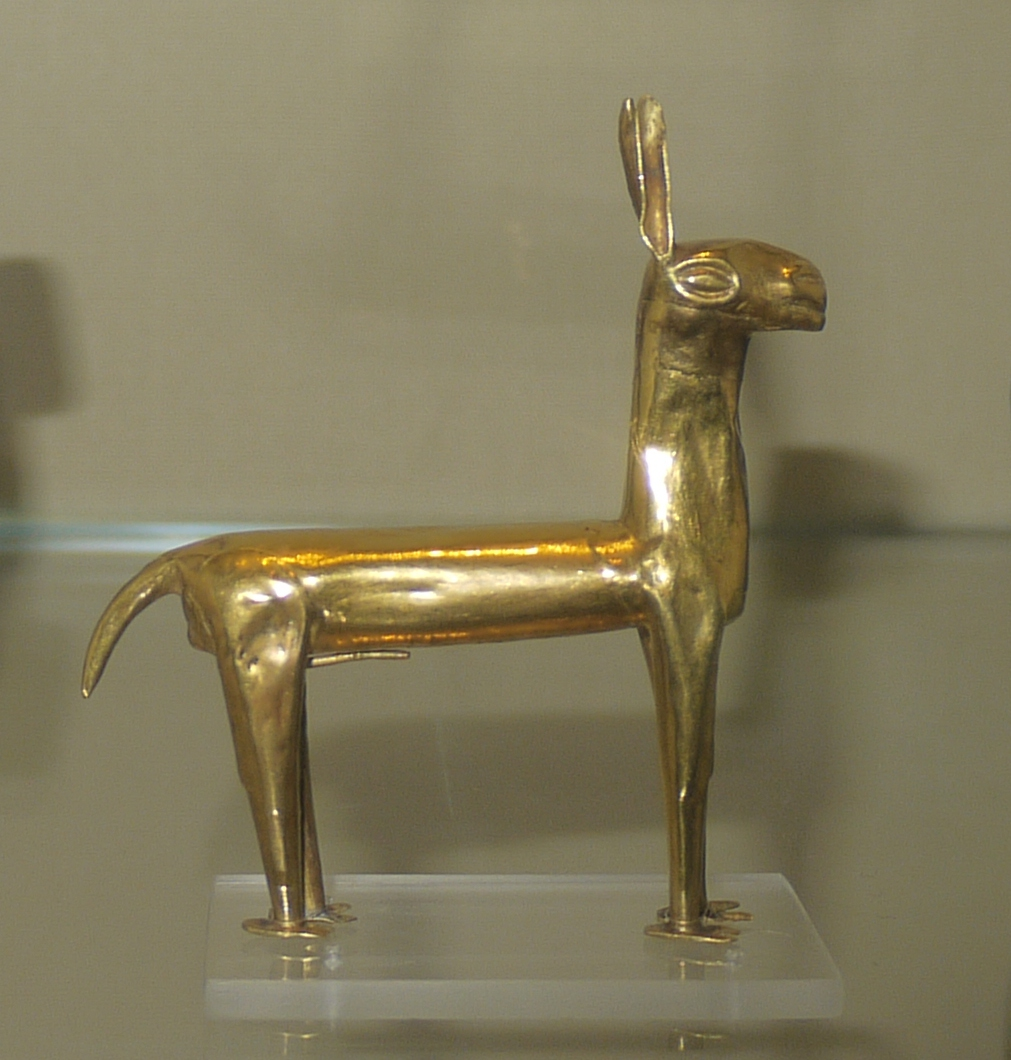
Room 2 – Miniature gold llama figurine, Inca, Peru, about 1500 AD

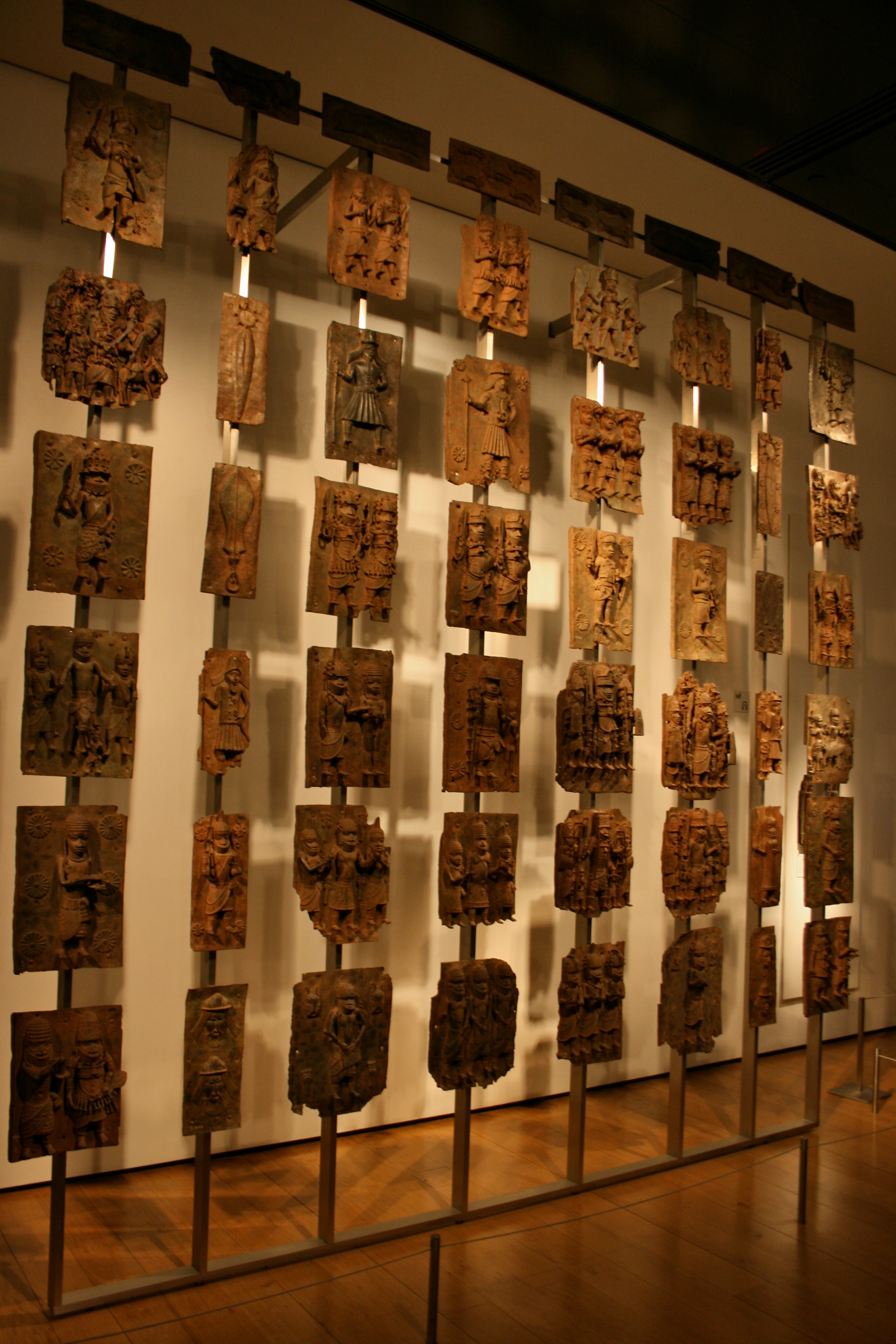
Room 25 – Part of the famous collection of Benin brass plaques, Nigeria, 1500–1600 AD

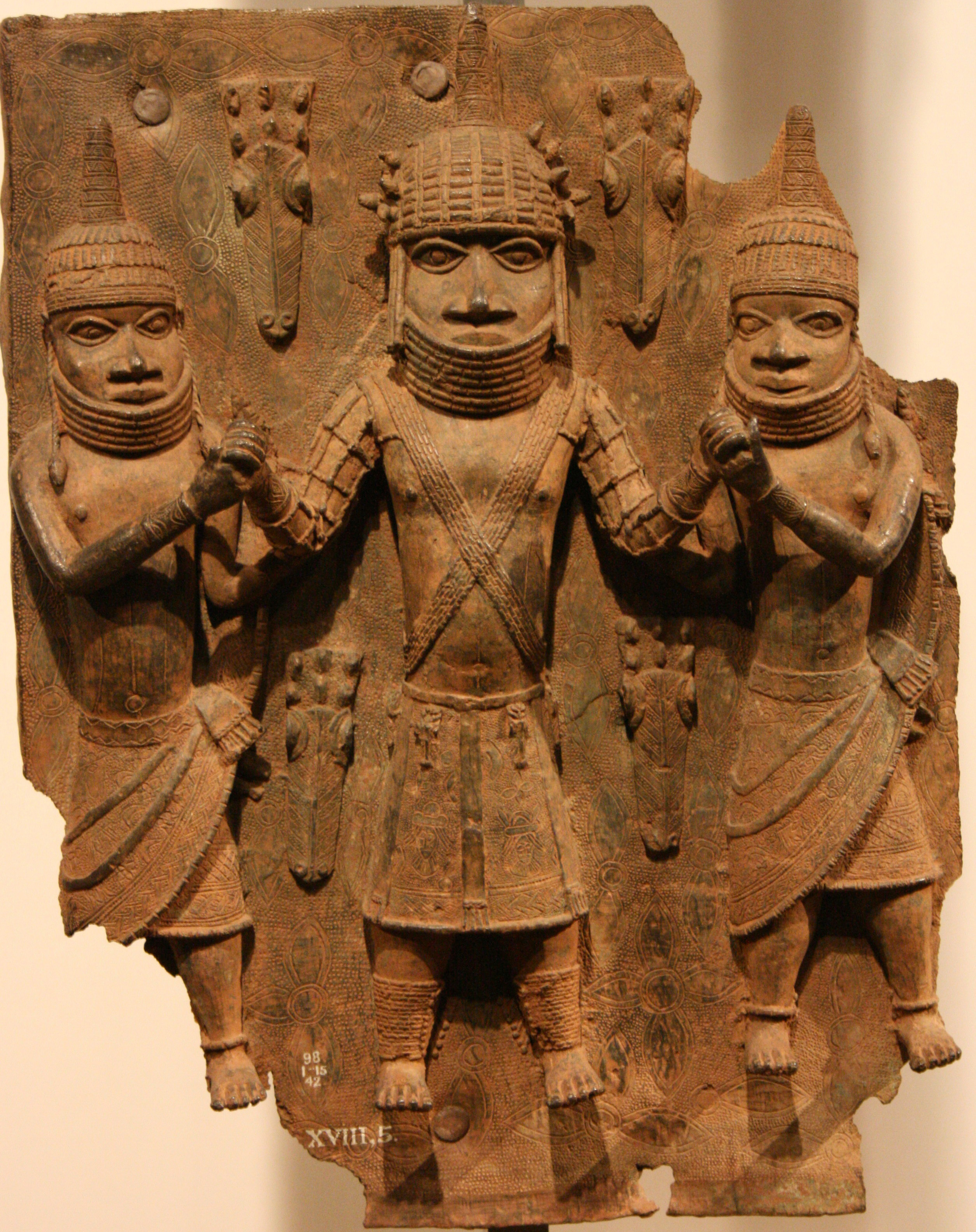
Room 25 – Detail of one of the Benin brass plaques in the museum, Nigeria, 1500–1600 AD

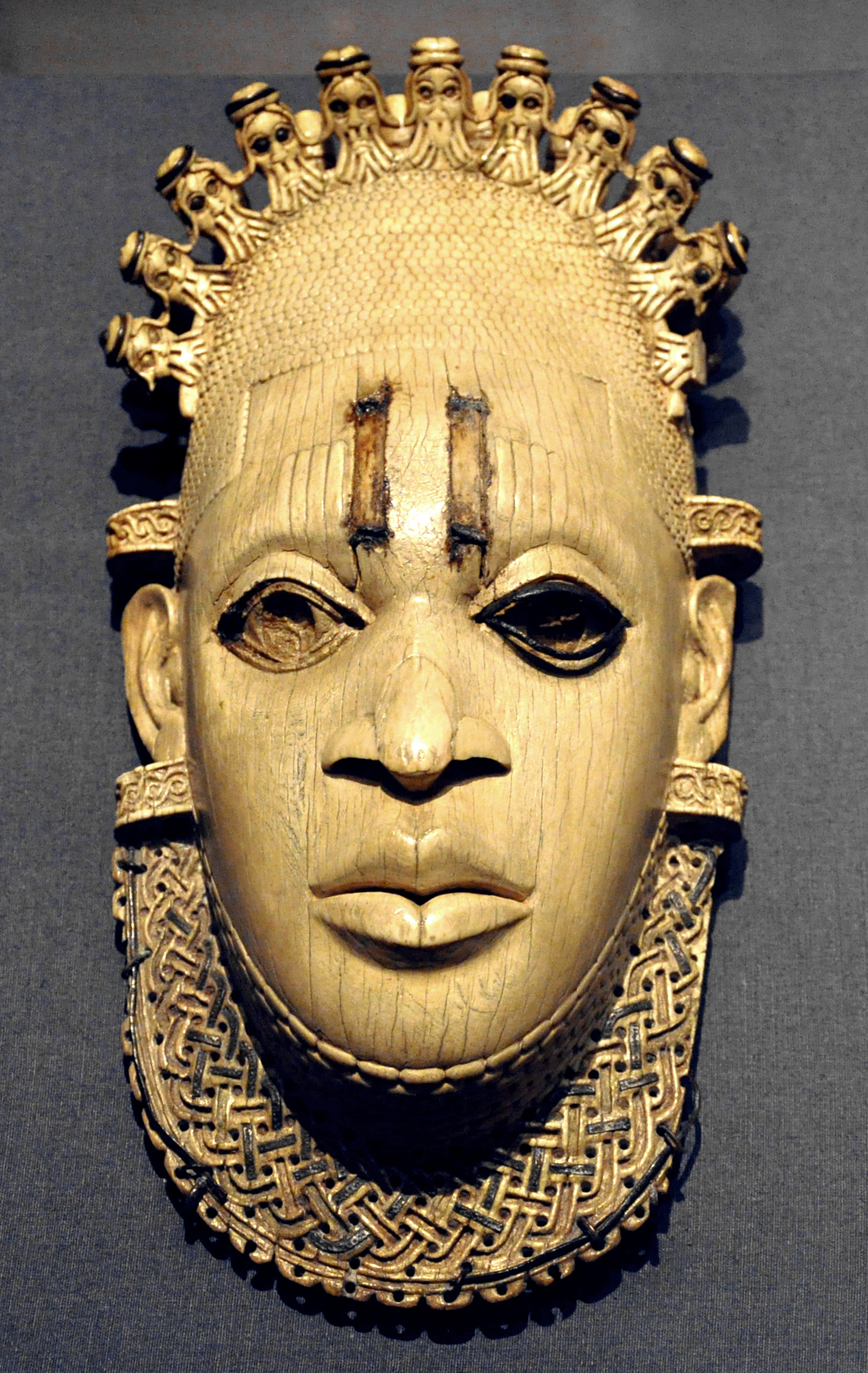
Room 25 – Benin ivory mask of Queen Idia, Nigeria, 16th century AD

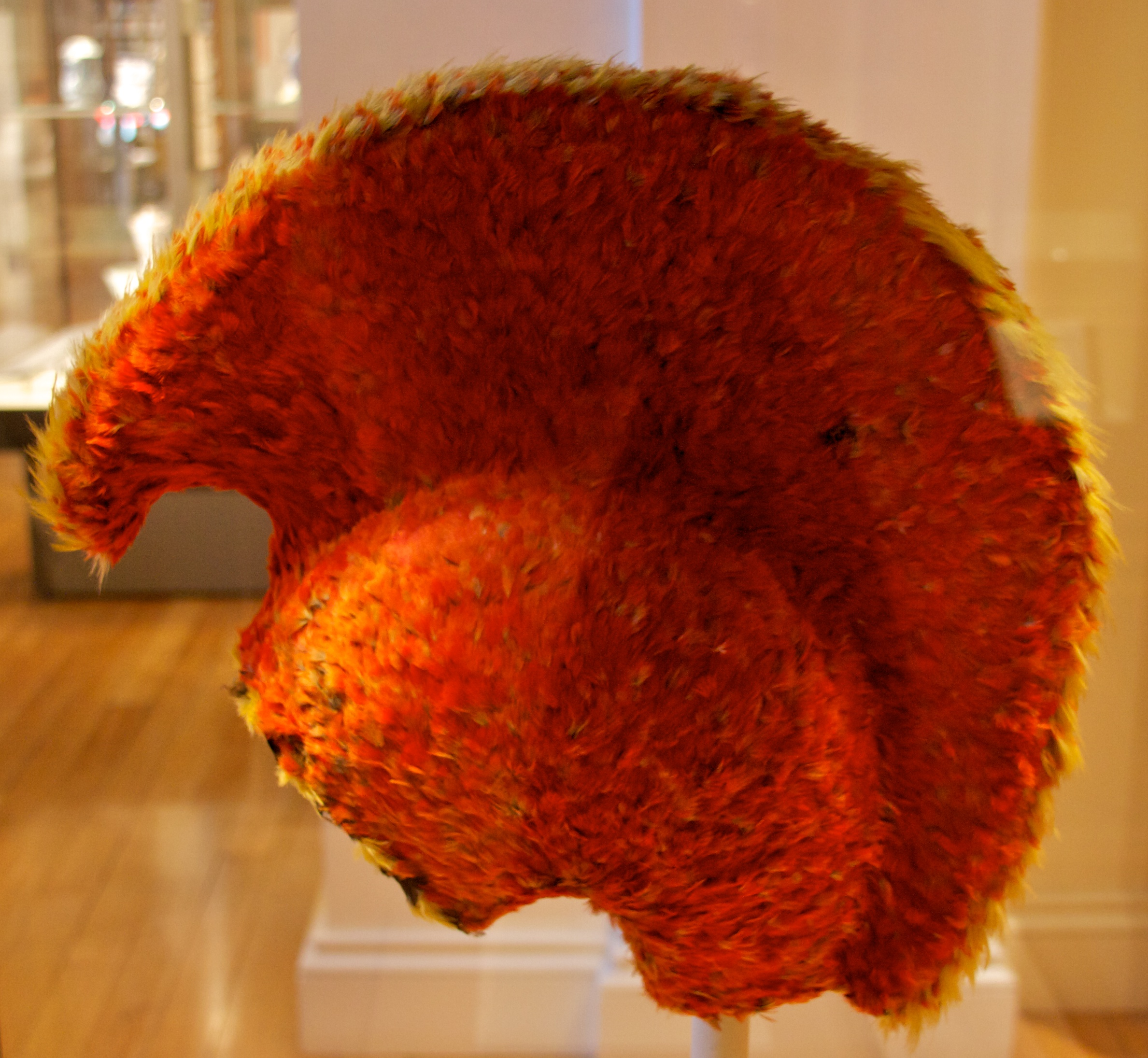
Room 24 – Hawaiian feather helmet or mahiole, late 1700s AD

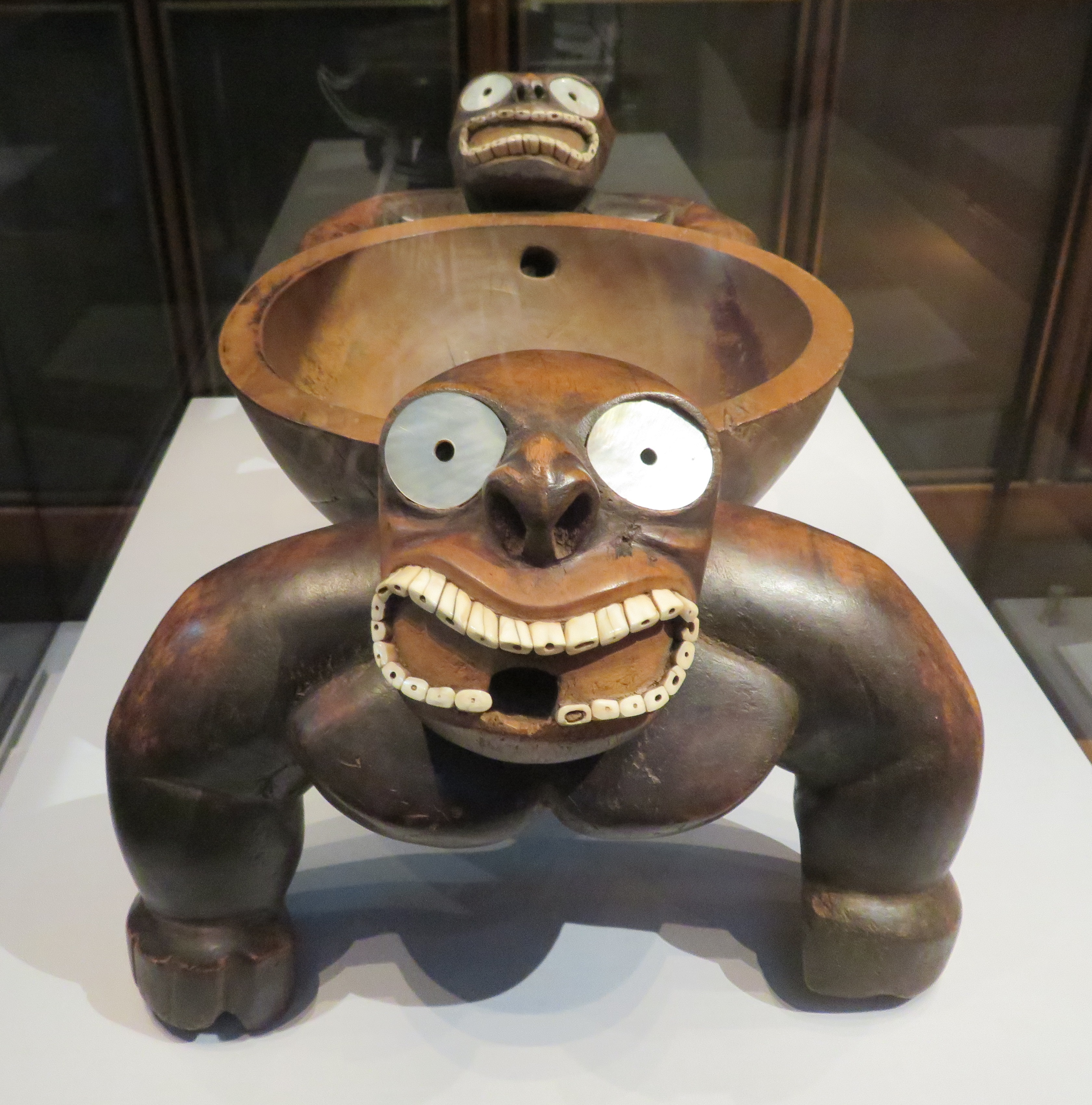
Bowl decorated with pearl shell and boars' tusks, used to serve the intoxicating drink kava, Hawaii, late 1700s AD

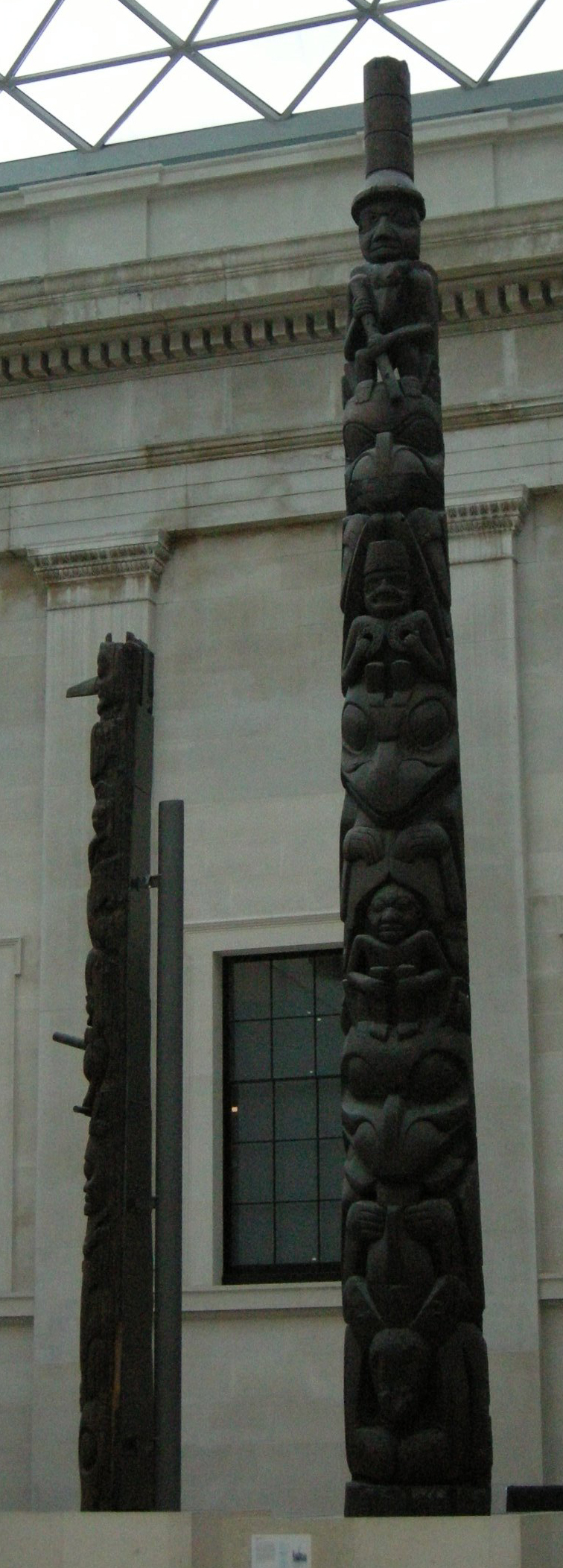
Great Court – Two house frontal totem poles, Haida, British Columbia, Canada, about 1850 AD

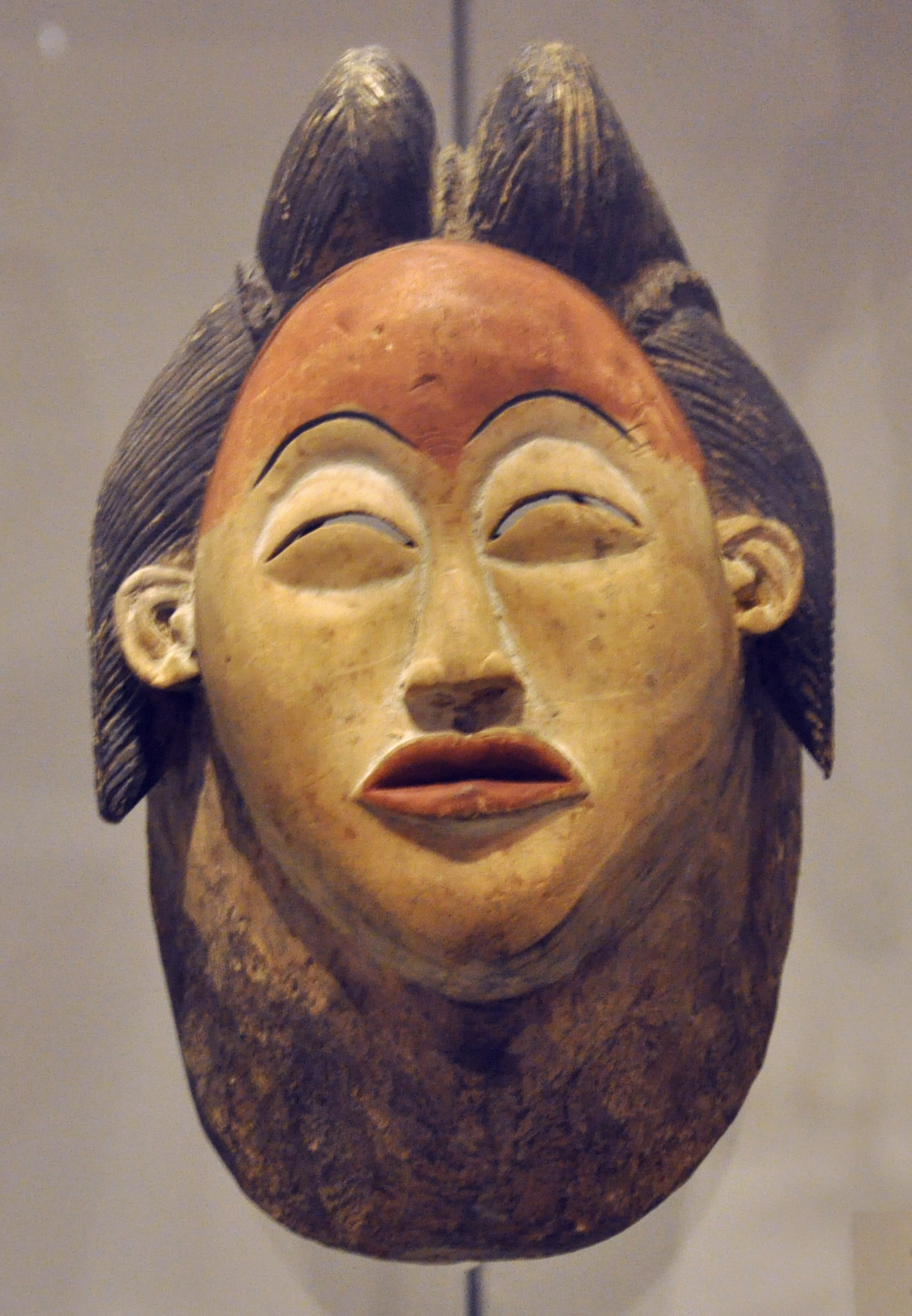
Room 25 – Mask (wood and pigment); Punu people, Gabon, 19th century AD

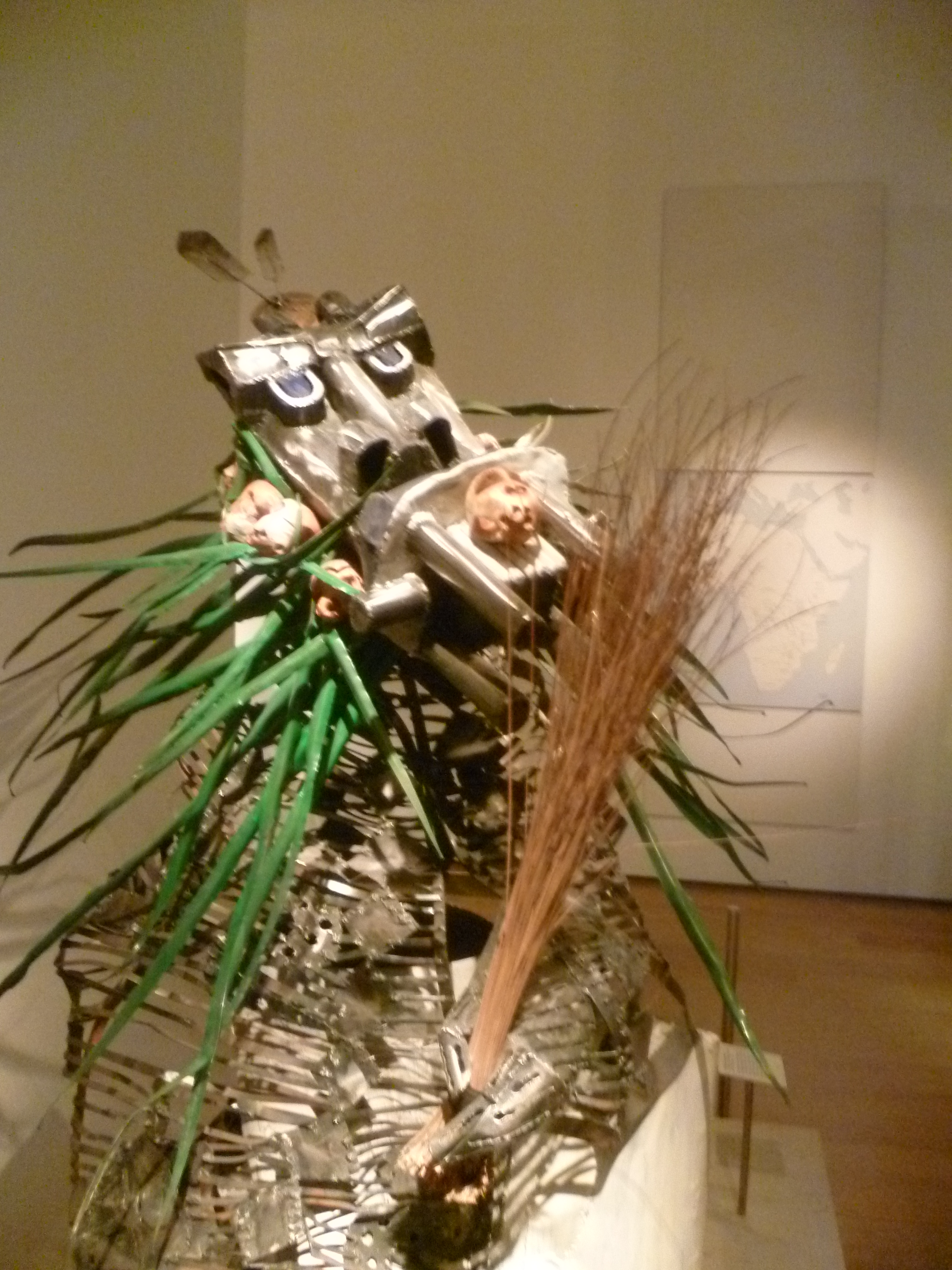
Room 25 – Otobo masquerade in the Africa Gallery, Nigeria, 20th century AD

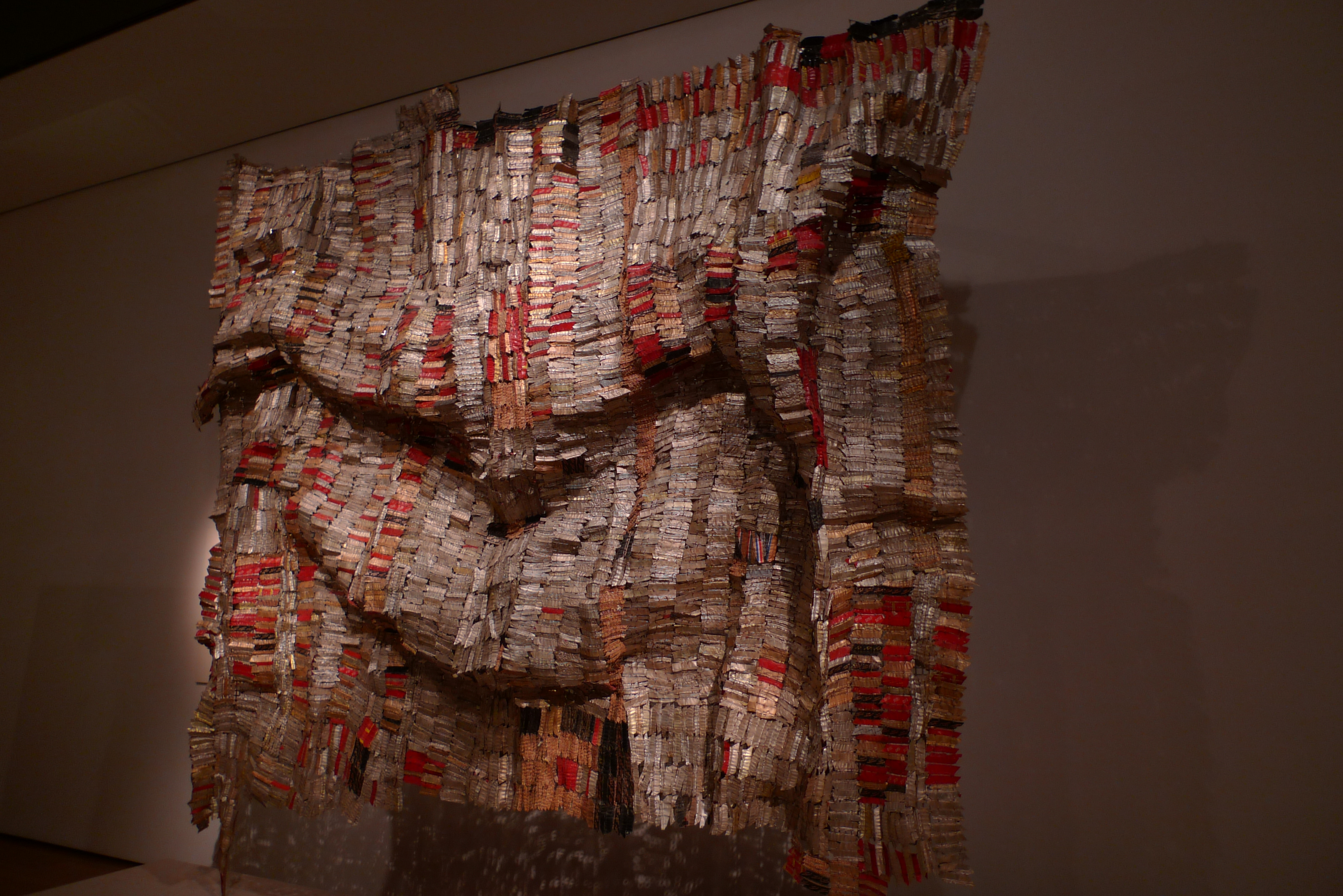
Room 25 – Modern interpretation of kente cloth from Ghana, late 20th century AD

=== Department of Money and Medals ===
The British Museum is home to one of the world's finest numismatic collections, comprising about a million objects, including coins, medals, tokens and paper money. The collection spans the entire history of coinage from its origins in the 7th century BC to the present day and is representative of both the East and West. The Department of Coins and Medals was created in 1861 and celebrated its 150th anniversary in 2011.

=== Department of Conservation and Scientific Research ===
This department was founded in 1920. Conservation has six specialist areas: ceramics & glass; metals; organic material (including textiles); stone, wall paintings and mosaics; Eastern pictorial art and Western pictorial art. The science department has and continues to develop techniques to date artefacts, analyse and identify the materials used in their manufacture, to identify the place an artefact originated and the techniques used in their creation. The department also publishes its findings and discoveries.

=== Libraries and archives ===
This department covers all levels of education, from casual visitors, schools, degree level and beyond. The museum's various libraries hold in excess of 350,000 books, journals and pamphlets covering all areas of the museum's collection. Also the general museum archives which date from its foundation in 1753 are overseen by this department; the individual departments have their own separate archives and libraries covering their various areas of responsibility, which can be consulted by the public on application. The Anthropology Library is especially large, with 120,000 volumes. However, the Paul Hamlyn Library, which had become the central reference library of the British Museum and the only library there freely open to the general public, closed permanently in August 2011. The website and online database of the collection also provide increasing amounts of information.

== British Museum Press ==
The British Museum Press (BMP) is the publishing business and a division of the British Museum Company Ltd., a company and a charity (established in 1973) wholly owned by the Trustees of the British Museum.

The BMP publishes both popular and scholarly illustrated books to accompany the exhibition programme and explore aspects of the general collection. Profits from their sales goes to support the British Museum.

Scholarly titles are published in the Research Publications series, all of which are peer-reviewed. This series was started in 1978 and was originally called Occasional Papers. The series is designed to disseminate research on items in the collection. To date, over 220 books have been published in this series. Around six titles are published each year in this series. They can be found on the British Museum Research Repository.

== Controversies and criticism ==
=== Contested artefacts ===
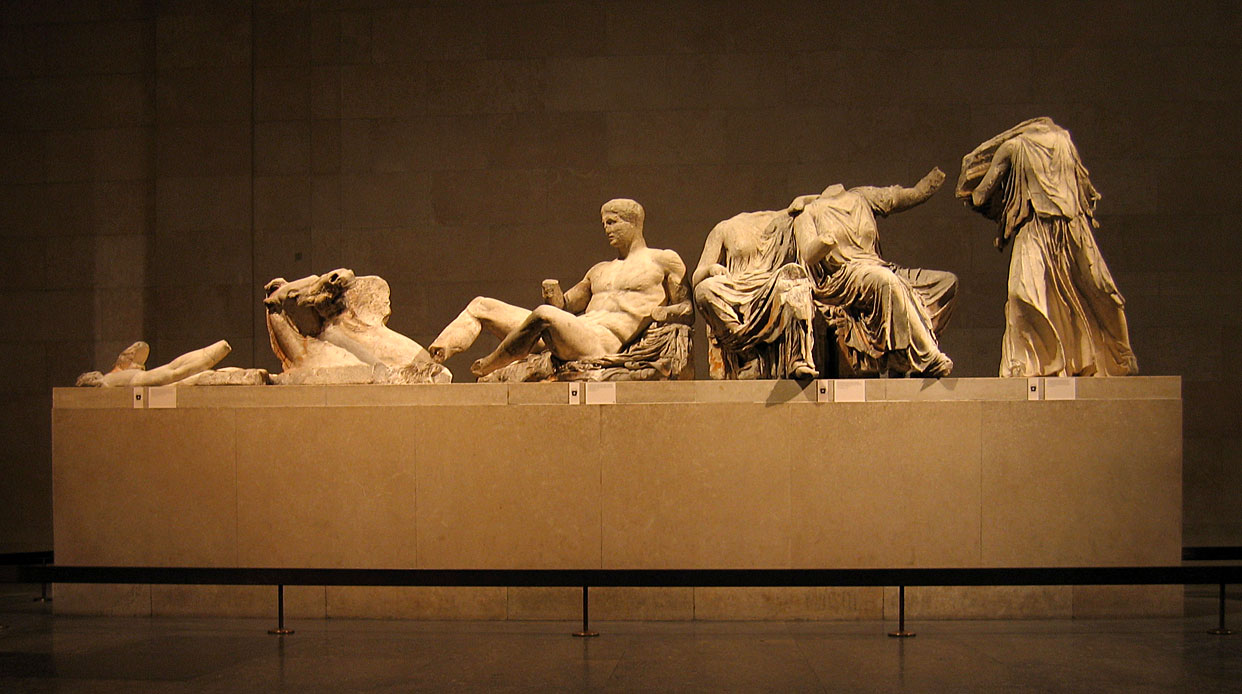
A few of the Elgin Marbles (also known as the Parthenon Marbles) from the East Pediment of the Parthenon in Athens.

It is a point of controversy whether museums should possess artefacts illegally taken from other countries, and the British Museum is a notable target for criticism. The Elgin Marbles, the Benin Bronzes, Ethiopian Tabots and the Rosetta Stone are among the most disputed objects in its collections, and organisations have been formed demanding the return of these artefacts to their native countries.

The Elgin Marbles or Parthenon Marbles claimed by Greece have been cited by UNESCO, among others, for restitution. From 1801 to 1812, Thomas Bruce, 7th Earl of Elgin's agents removed about half of the surviving sculptures from the Parthenon, as well as sculptures from the Propylaea and Erechtheion. The former director of the museum has stated, "We are indebted to Elgin for having rescued the Parthenon sculptures and others from the Acropolis from the destruction they were suffering, as well as from the damage that the Acropolis monuments, including the sculptures that he did not remove, have suffered since." The British Museum itself damaged some of the artefacts during restoration in the 1930s. In late 2022, the British Museum had entered into preliminary negotiations with the Greek government about the future of the sculptures.

There is also controversy over artefacts taken during the destruction of the Old Summer Palace in Beijing by an Anglo-French expeditionary force during the Second Opium War in 1860, an event which drew protest from Victor Hugo. The British Museum and the Victoria and Albert Museum, among others, have been asked since 2009 to open their archives for investigation by a team of Chinese investigators as a part of an international mission to document Chinese national treasures in foreign collections. In 2010 Neil MacGregor, the former Director of the British Museum, said he hoped that both British and Chinese investigators would work together on the controversial collection. In 2020 the museum appointed a curator to research the history of its collections, including disputed items.

The British Museum has stated that the "restitutionist premise, that whatever was made in a country must return to an original geographical site, would empty both the British Museum and the other great museums of the world". The museum has also argued that the British Museum Act 1963 prevents any object from leaving its collection once it has entered it. "The Museum owns its collections, but its Trustees are not empowered to dispose of them". Nevertheless, it has returned items such as Tasmanian Aboriginal burial remains when this was consistent with legislation regarding the disposal of items in the collections.

==== List of contested artefacts ====
- Elgin Marbles – claimed by Greece and backed by UNESCO among others for restitution
- Benin Bronzes – claimed by Nigeria; the Nigerian government has passed a resolution demanding the return of all 700 bronze pieces. 30 pieces of the bronzes were sold by the British Museum privately from the 1950s until 1972, mostly back to the Nigerians.
- Rosetta Stone – claimed by Egypt
- Ethiopian Tabots, Pre-Axumite Civilisation Coins – claimed by Ethiopia
- Maqdala Collection, various religious and artistic objects, claimed by Ethiopia
- Asante Gold Regalia, personal jewellery and royal insignia worn by the Asante king/emperor – claimed by Ghana
- Oxus Treasure – in 2007 the President of Tajikistan ordered experts to look into making a claim for these Achaemenid Empire gold and silver artefacts.
- Dunhuang manuscripts, part of a cache of scrolls, manuscripts, paintings, scriptures, and relics from the Mogao Caves, including the Diamond Sutra – claimed by the People's Republic of China
- Aboriginal shield – claimed by Aboriginal people of Australia.
- Hoa Hakananai'a, a Moai – claimed by Chile on behalf of Easter Island/Rapa Nui
- Irish artefacts — the Bell Shrine of St. Cuileáin, Londesborough Brooch, swords, half of the Dowris Hoard, part of the Mooghaun North Hoard, the Dunaverney flesh-hook, the Kells Crozier, torcs, four crucifixion plaques, armlets, seals, religious plaques, and rings.
- Welsh artefacts – the Mold gold cape the Rhos Rydd Shield, the Moel Hebog shield and the Llanllyfni lunula.
- Four stolen drawings (Nazi plunder) – Compensation paid to Uri Peled for the amount of £175,000 by the British Museum
- Repatriation and reburial of human remains is a controversial issue, and the British Museum has issued a policy on the subject.

=== Nazi-looted art ===
In 2002 the heirs of Arthur Feldmann, an art collector murdered in the Holocaust, requested that four old master drawings stolen by the Gestapo in 1939 be returned to the family. A High Court of Justice judge ruled in 2005 that it would be illegal for the British Museum to return artworks looted by the Nazis to a Jewish family, despite its willingness and moral obligation to do so. The law was changed in 2009, and again in 2022 giving museums additional powers to return looted art or provide compensation. Feldmann's heirs accepted a compensation payment for a looted drawing and stated that they were happy the drawing would remain in the British Museum collection.

According to the British Museum Spoliation report published by the Collections Trust in 2017, "Around 30% of some 21,350 continental and British drawings acquired since 1933 have an uncertain or incomplete provenance for the 1933–1945 period". The museum lists these works on its website and investigates claims for restitution.

=== BP sponsorship ===
Since 2016, there have been a number of protests by activist groups, trade unions and the public against the British Museum's relationship with the oil company BP which the protesters believe implicates the museum in global warming. In July 2019, Ahdaf Soueif resigned from the British Museum's board of trustees in protest against the sponsorship. In February 2020, 1,500 demonstrators, including British Museum staff, took part in a day of protest over the issue. In December 2023, it was announced that the British Museum had agreed to a new £50 million sponsorship deal with BP.

=== Chairman's Advisory Group ===
The Chairman's Advisory Group is an informal group of business leaders who provide advice to the chairman on various issues including the museum's relationship with the British government and policy on the museum's collections. Its existence was made public after a freedom of information request by a group campaigning against the museum's links with the fossil fuel industry. The museum has declined to name the members of the advisory group as they are acting in their personal capacity.

=== Thefts ===
Thefts from the museum include: several historic coins and medals in the 1970s; a 17th-century Japanese Kakiemon figure in 1990; two Meiji figurines and a fragment of a gold ring in 1991; fifteen Roman coins and jewellery worth £250,000 in 1993; and a Japanese chest and two Persian books in 1996.

In July 2002 a marble head, valued at £50,000, was stolen from the Archaic Greek gallery. In 2004, 15 Chinese artefacts including jewels, ornate hairpins and fingernail guards were stolen. In 2017, it was revealed that a Cartier diamond had been missing since 2011.

In August 2023, a staff member was fired after it emerged that items including gold, jewellery and gems had been stolen over a "significant" period of time. The incident led to an investigation by the Metropolitan Police and an independent review by the museum. Some of the missing artefacts were later found to have been sold on eBay for considerably less than their estimated value. The museum had been warned of the thefts as early as 2021. The museum's director, Hartwig Fischer, resigned because of the museum's inadequate response to the warnings of theft. The number of artefacts stolen was estimated to be about 2,000. As a consequence of the thefts, the museum announced a five-year plan to digitise the complete collection and make it available to view online. By May 2024, 626 of the missing items had been recovered.

=== Copyright settlement ===
In August 2023, the British Museum reached a settlement with the translator Yilin Wang over her translations of poetry by Qiu Jin. The museum had used her work without credit or permission in their exhibition China's Hidden Century which ran between May 2023 and October 2023.

=== Tibet naming conventions ===
In January 2025, the British Museum was criticized by Tibetan human rights groups for referring to Tibet as "Xizang," the current preferred term of the government of the People's Republic of China.

=== Revisions to Middle East gallery terminology ===
In 2026, the British Museum revised the terminology used in certain ancient Middle East exhibits, particularly those concerning the southern Levant during the late 2nd millennium BC. Labels on maps and display panels were changed from Palestine to the historical region of Canaan or the Kingdoms of Israel and Judah, as appropriate to the period in question. The museum said the update was made for "historical accuracy," following concerns that the terms "Palestine" and "people of Palestinian descent" were being applied retroactively to periods when no such distinct entity existed in ancient Israel and Judah.

== Galleries ==
Building

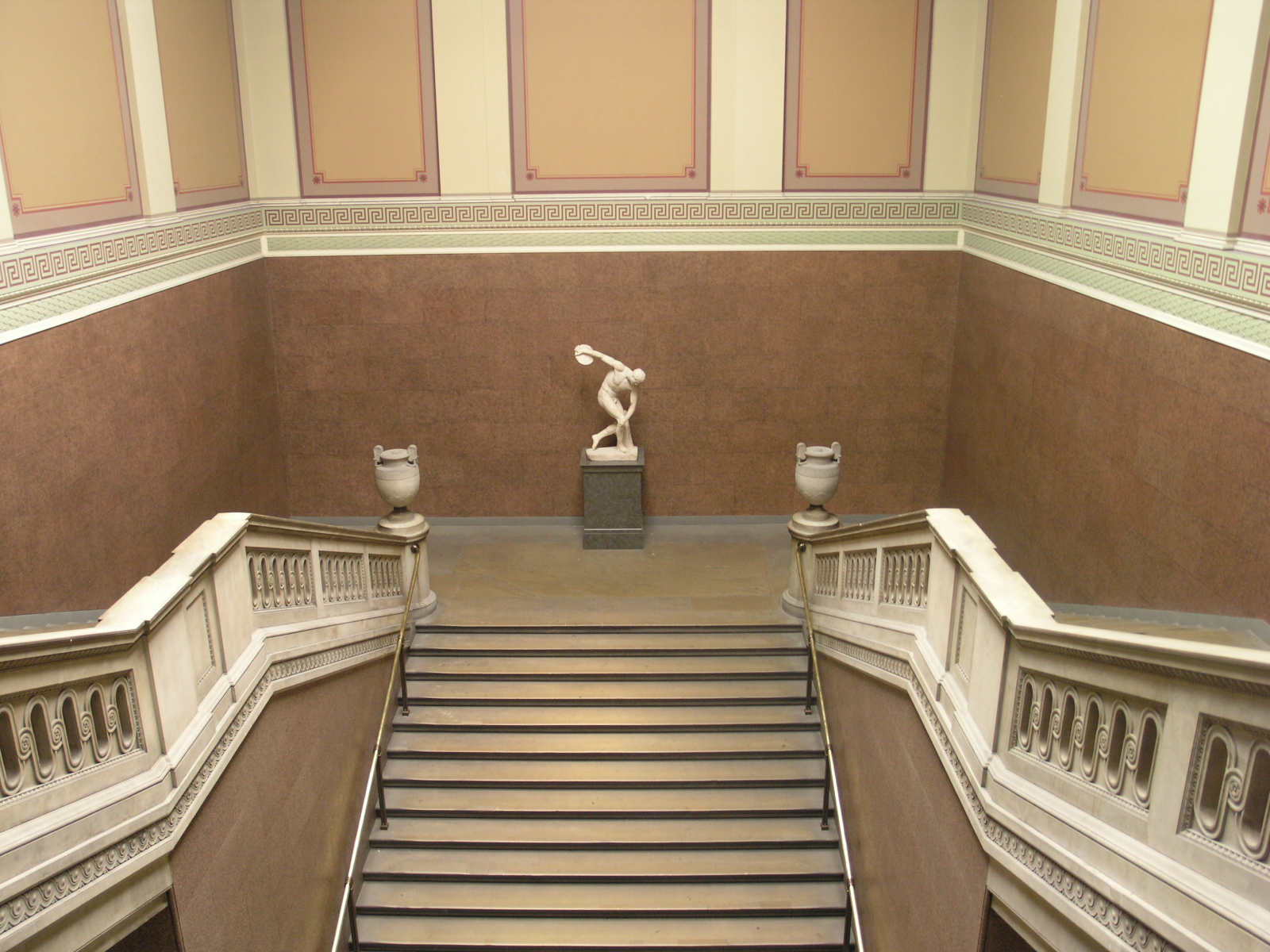
Main Staircase, Discobolus of Myron (the Discus-Thrower)

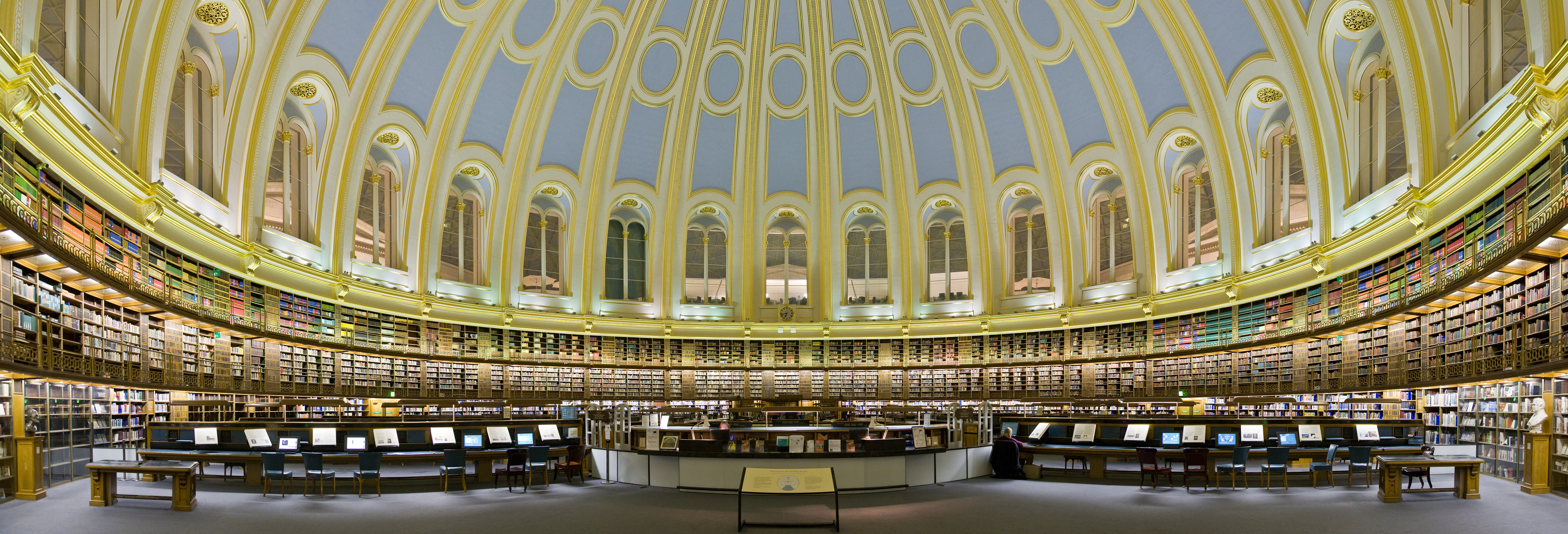
British Museum Reading Room

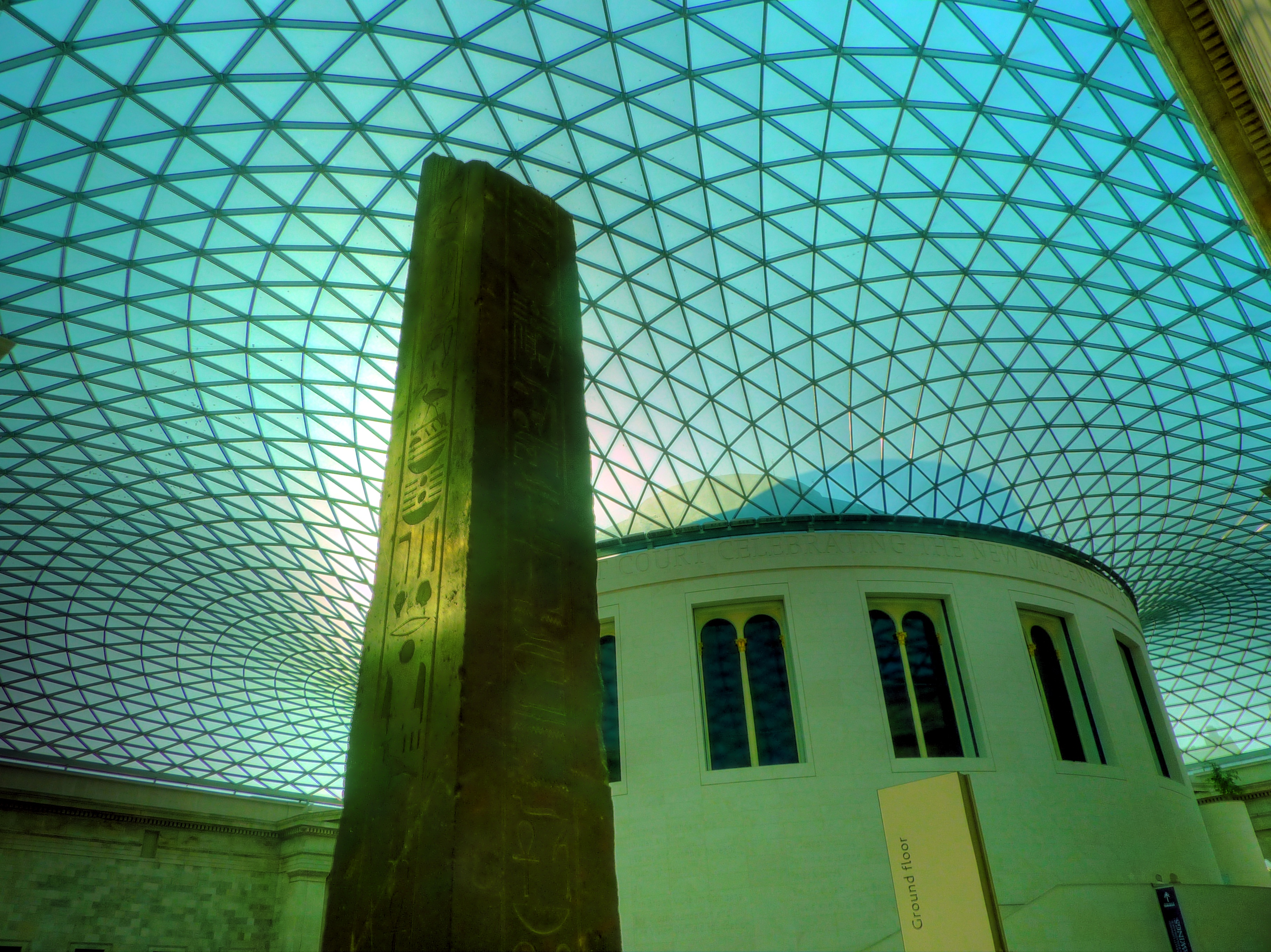
Ceiling of the Great Court and the black siltstone obelisks of Nectanebo II, c. 350 BC

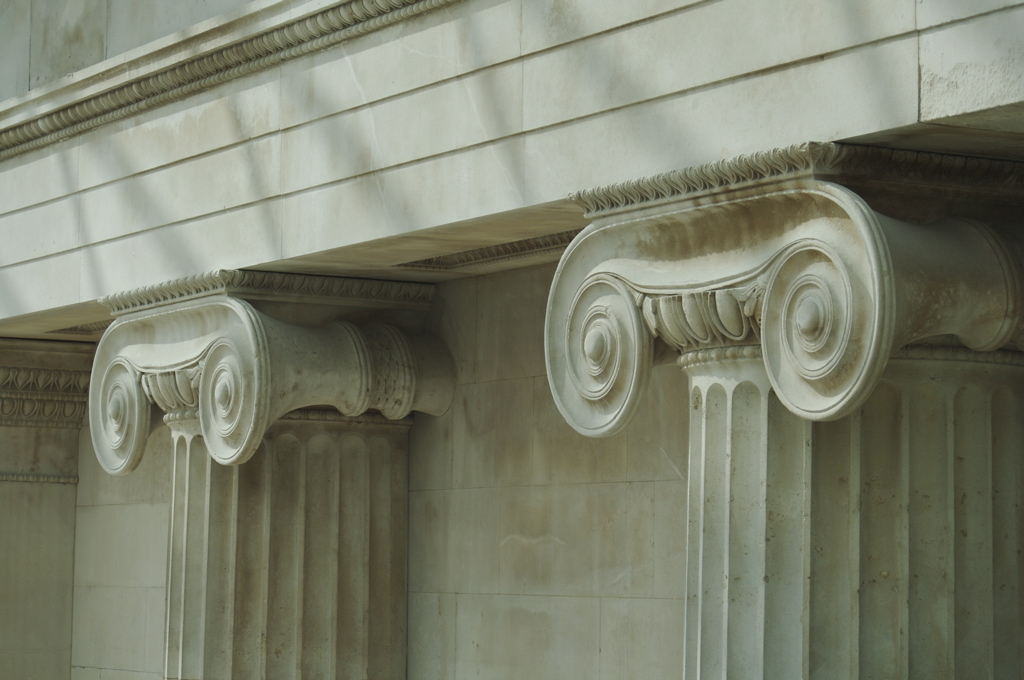
Detail of an Ionic capital on a pilaster in the Great Court

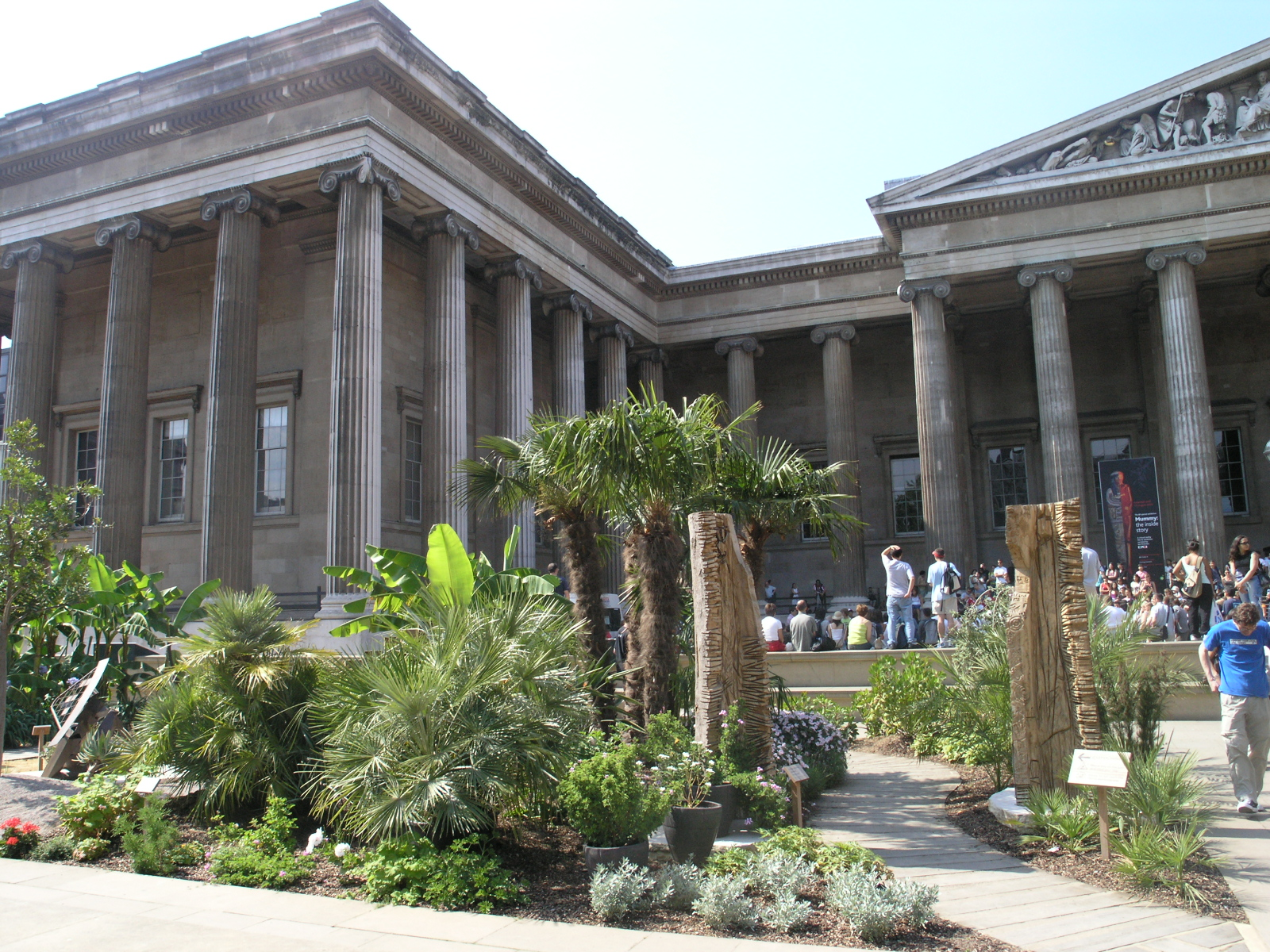
African Garden – created by BBC TV programme Ground Force

Museum galleries

Department of Ancient Egypt and Sudan

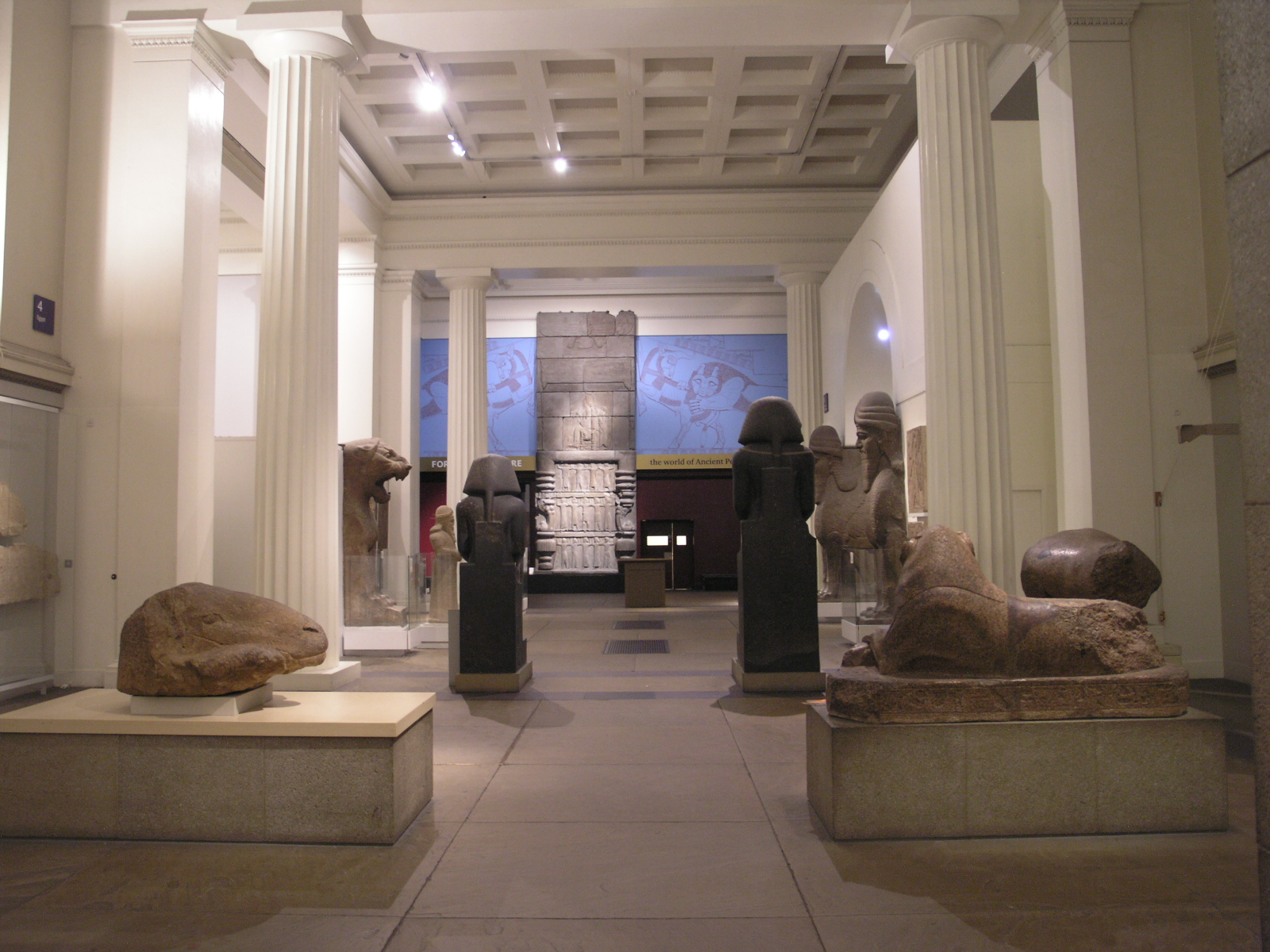
Room 4 – Egyptian Sculpture, view towards the Assyrian Transept

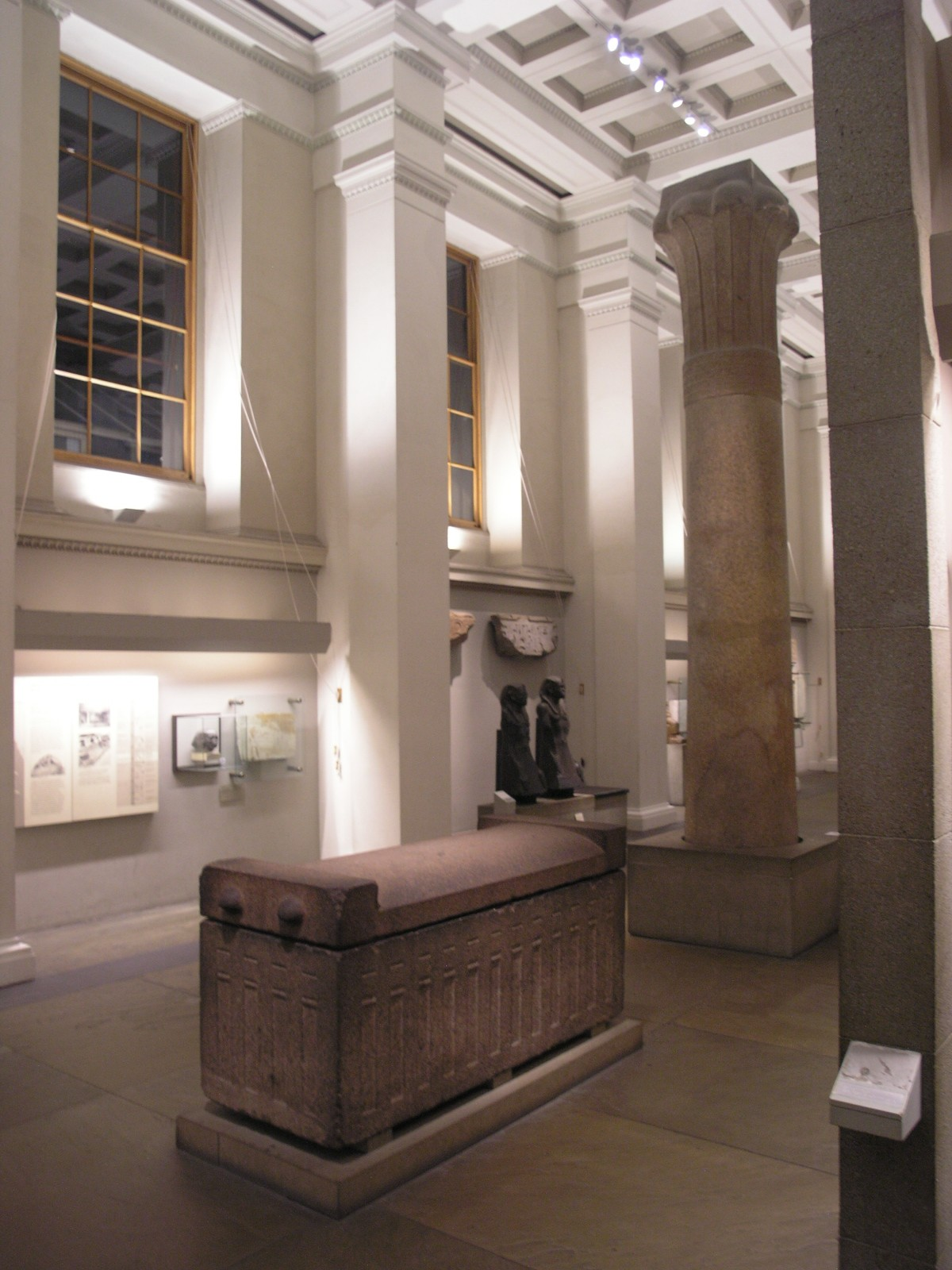
Room 4

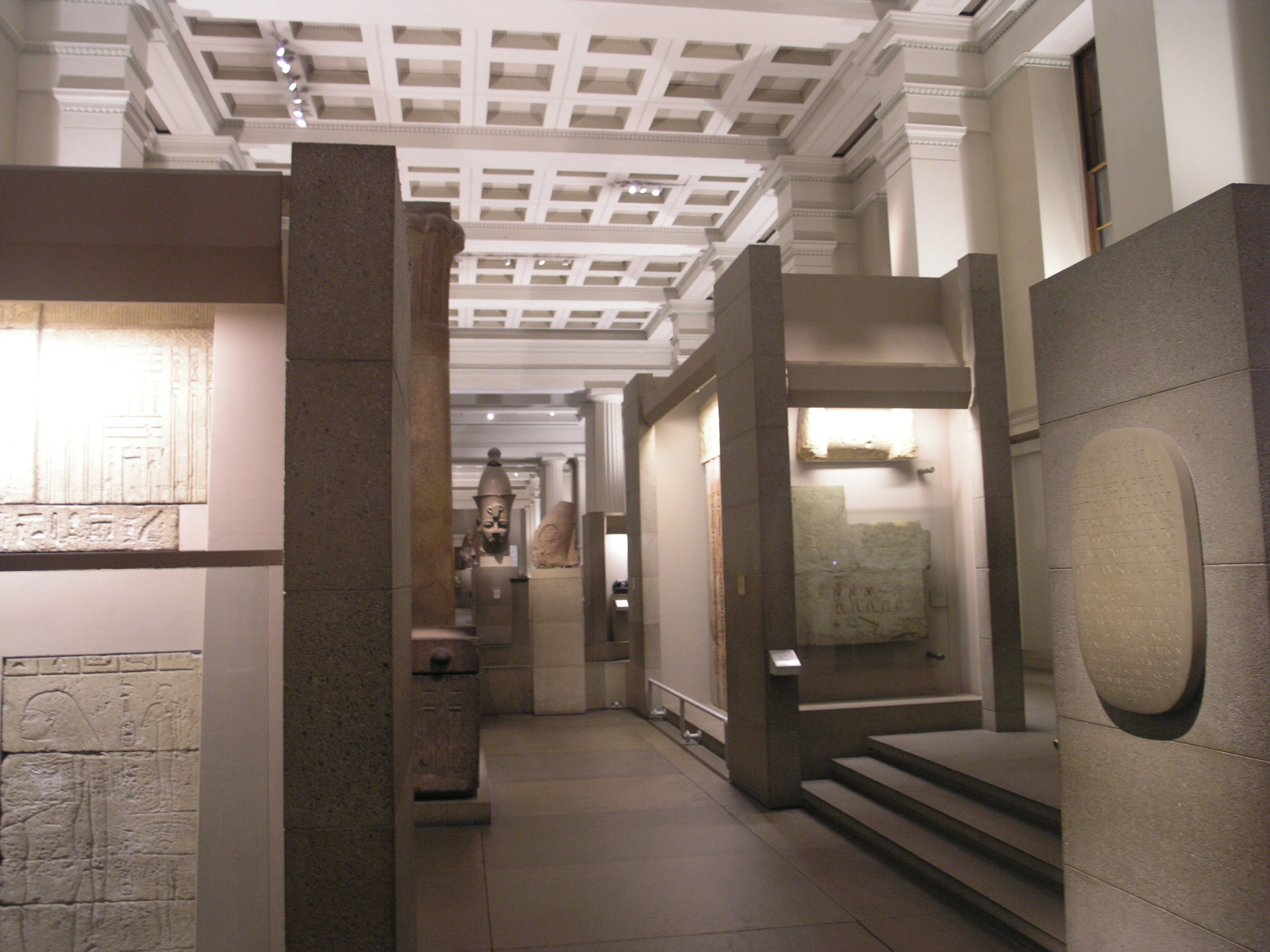
Room 4

Britain: Room 50 and environs

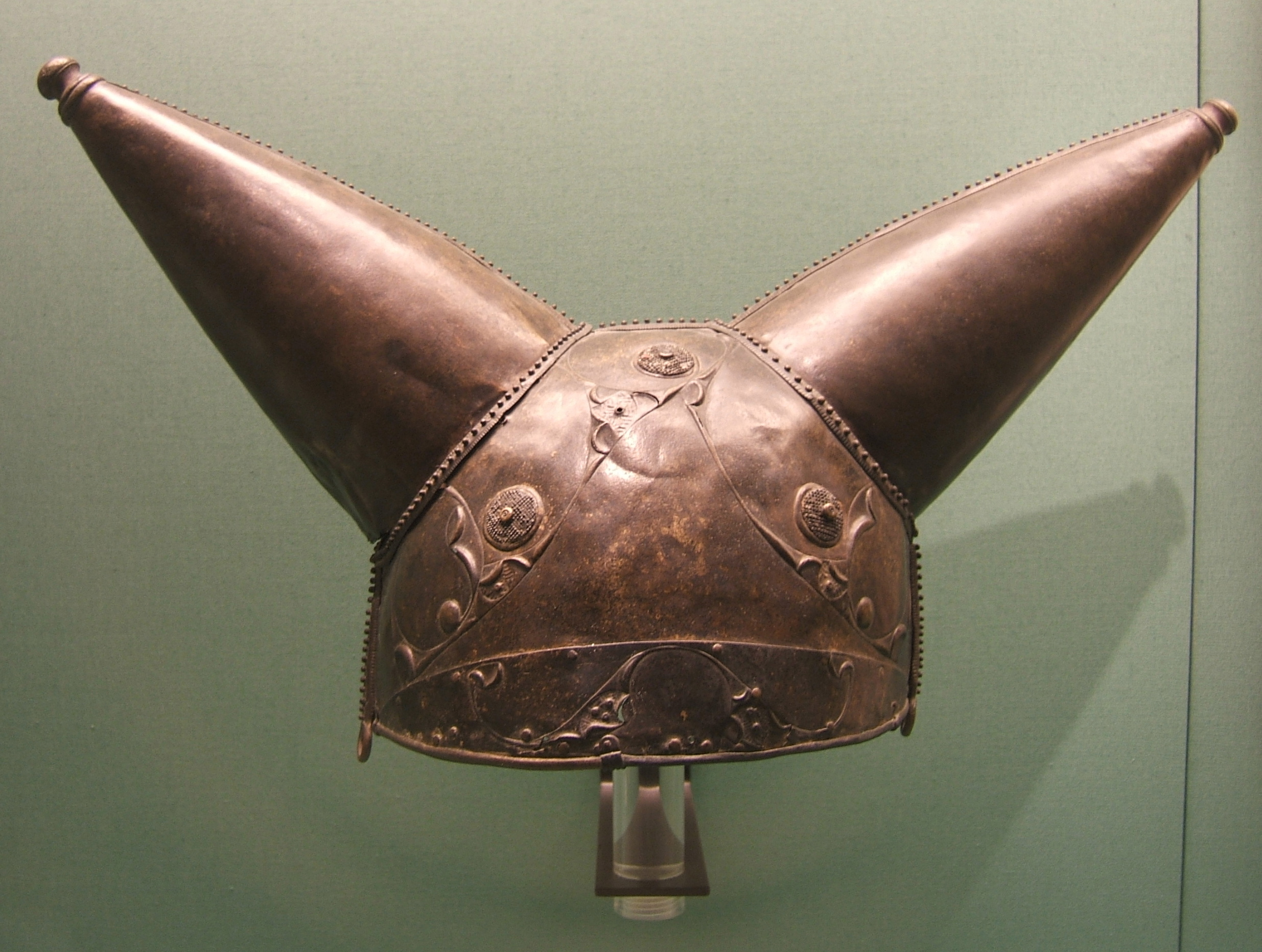
Horned Helmet from the British Iron Age

Department of the Middle East

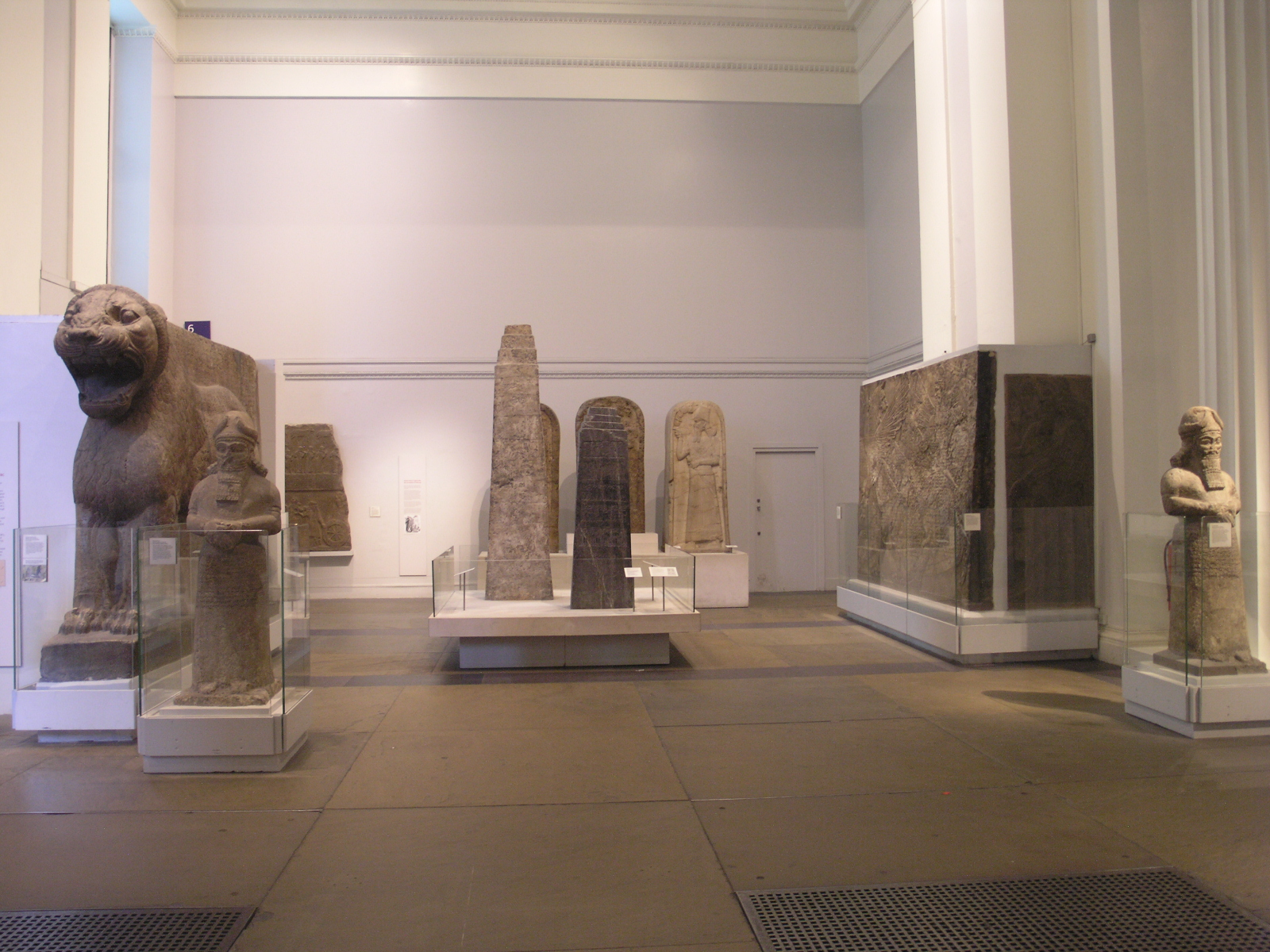
The British Museum, Room 6 – Assyrian Sculpture

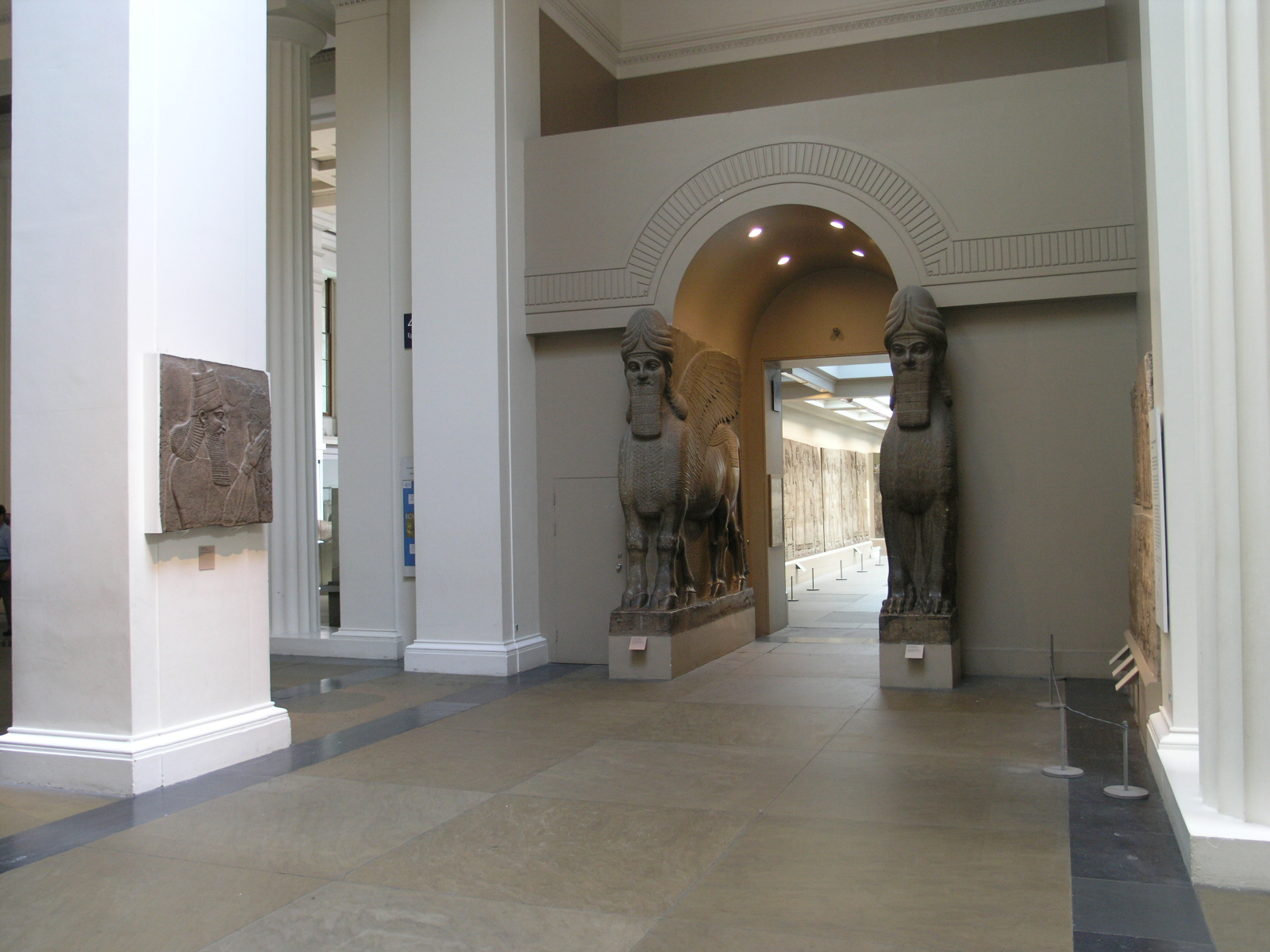
Room 8 – Pair of Lamassu from Nimrud and reliefs from the palace of Tiglath-Pileser III

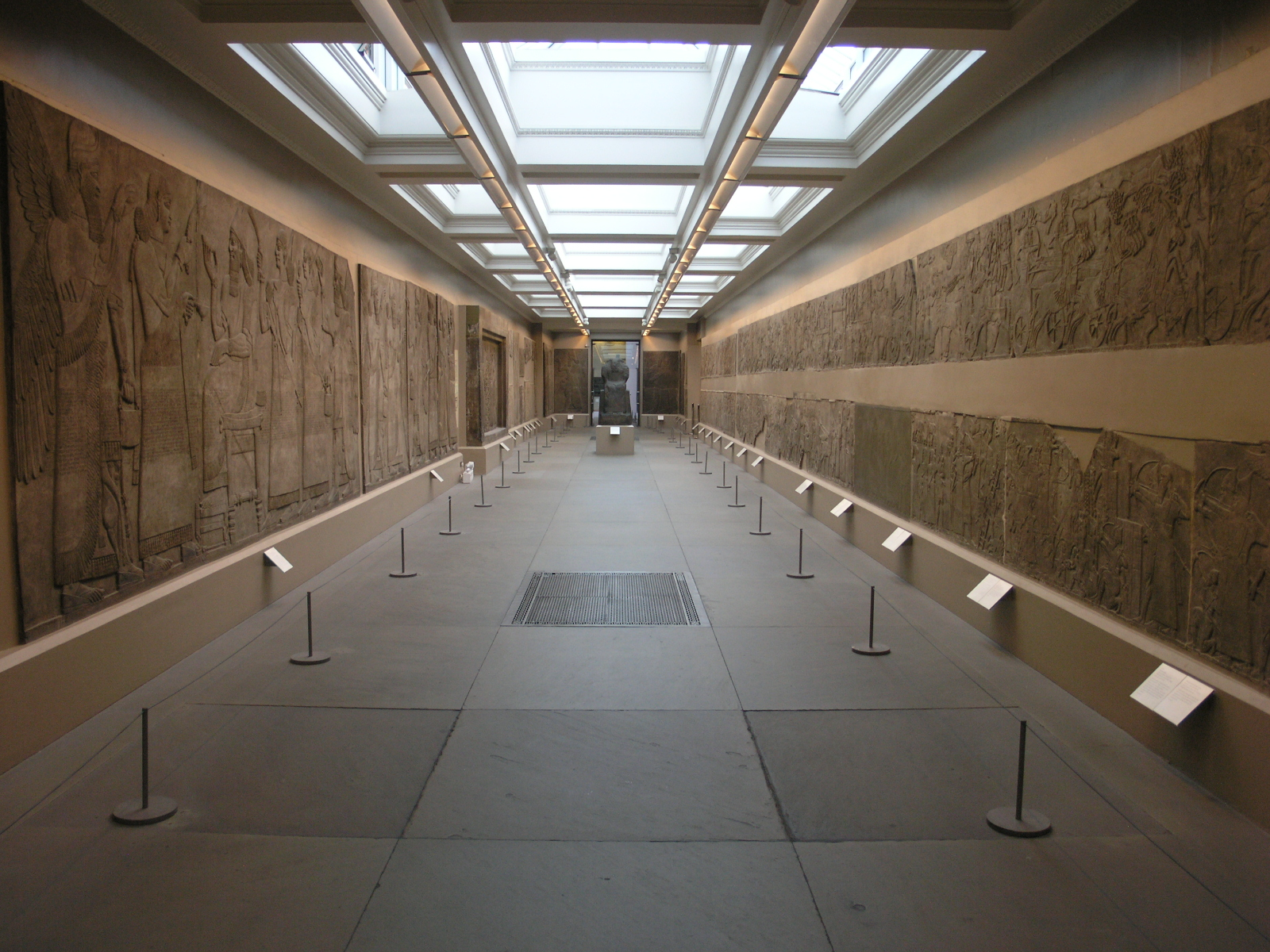
Room 7 – Reliefs from the North-west palace of Ashurnasirpal II, Nimrud

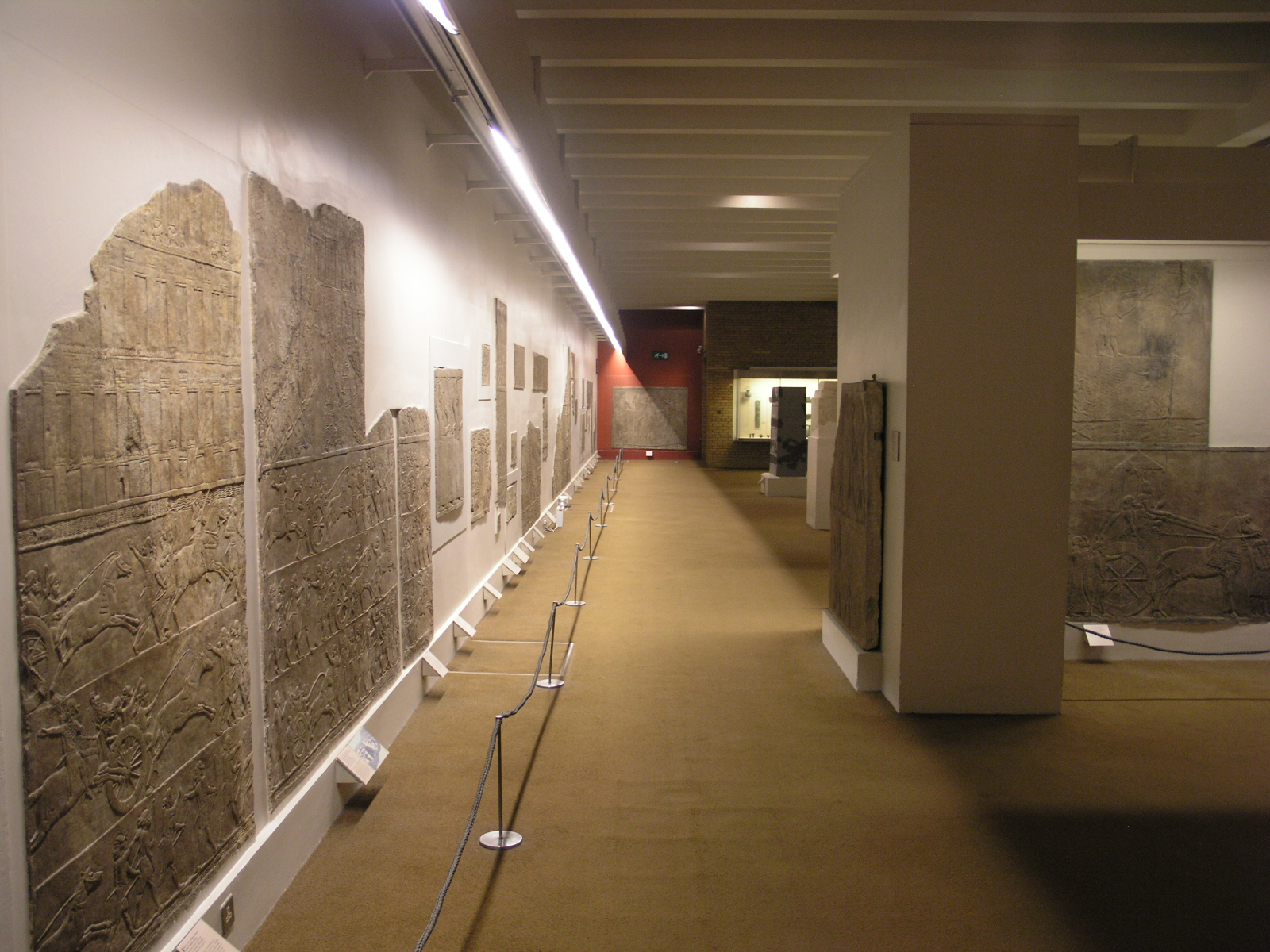
Room 89 – Nimrud and Nineveh Palace Reliefs

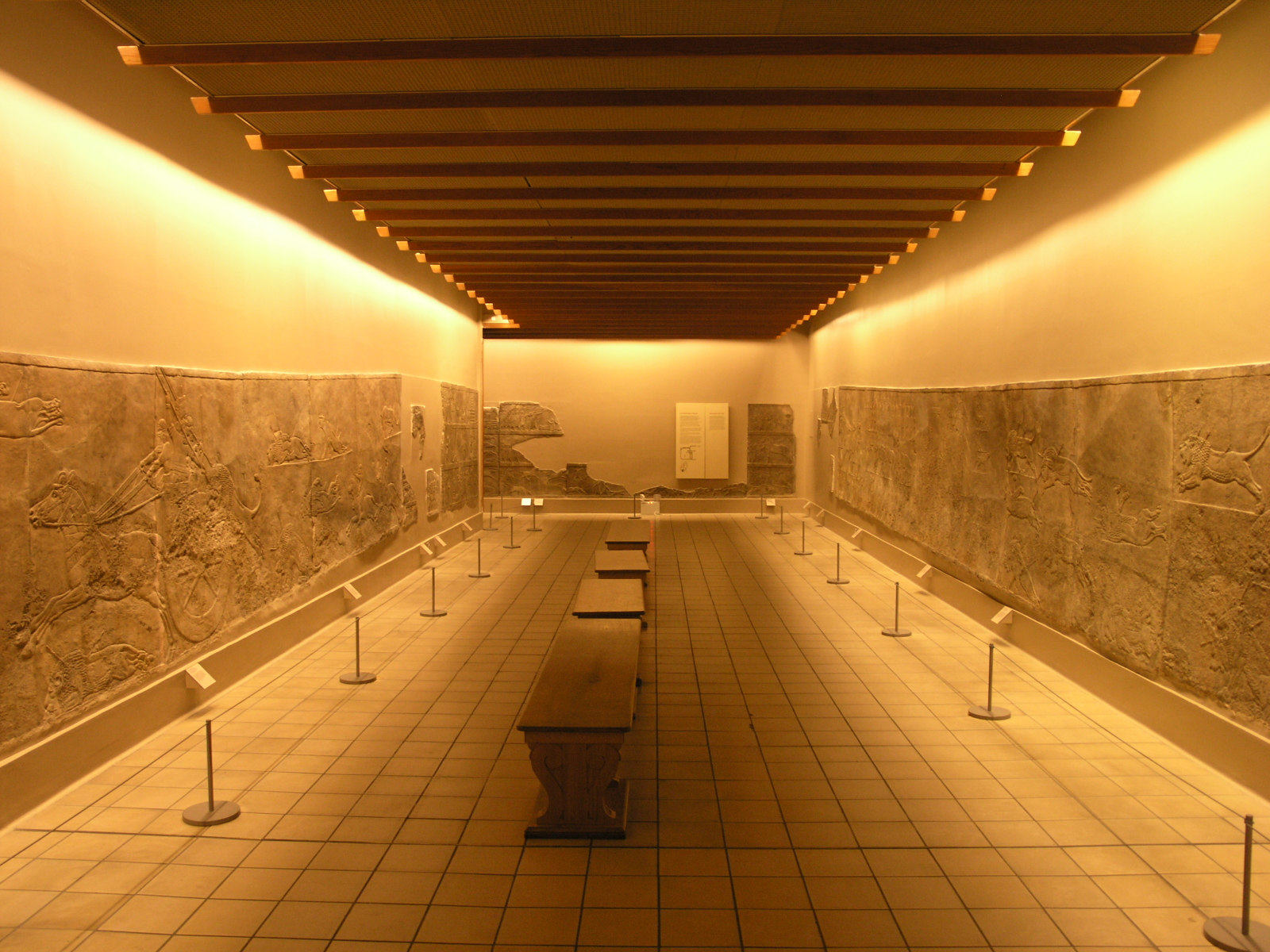
Room 10 – Nineveh, The Royal Lion Hunt

Department of Greece and Rome

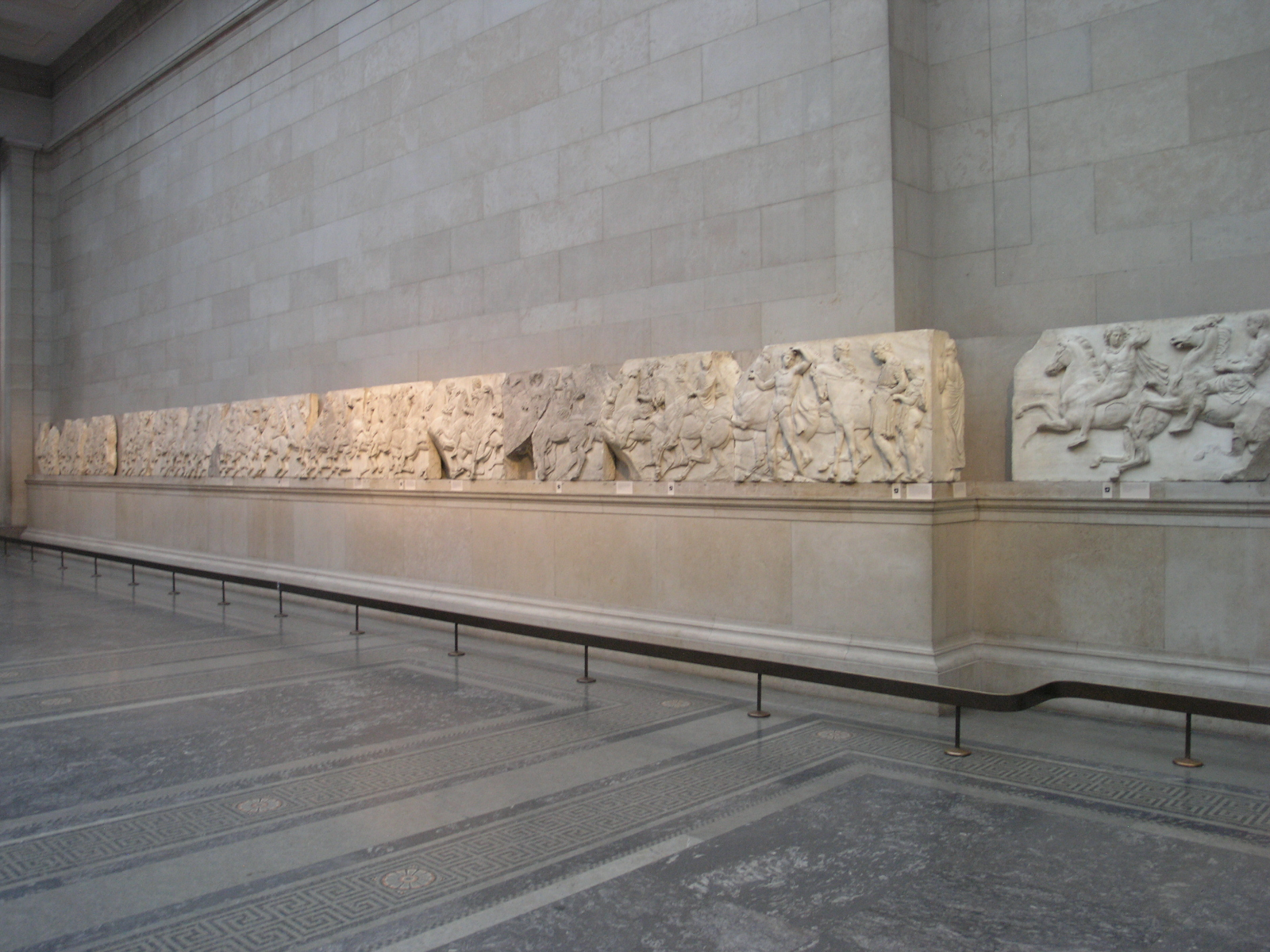
Room 18 – Ancient Greece

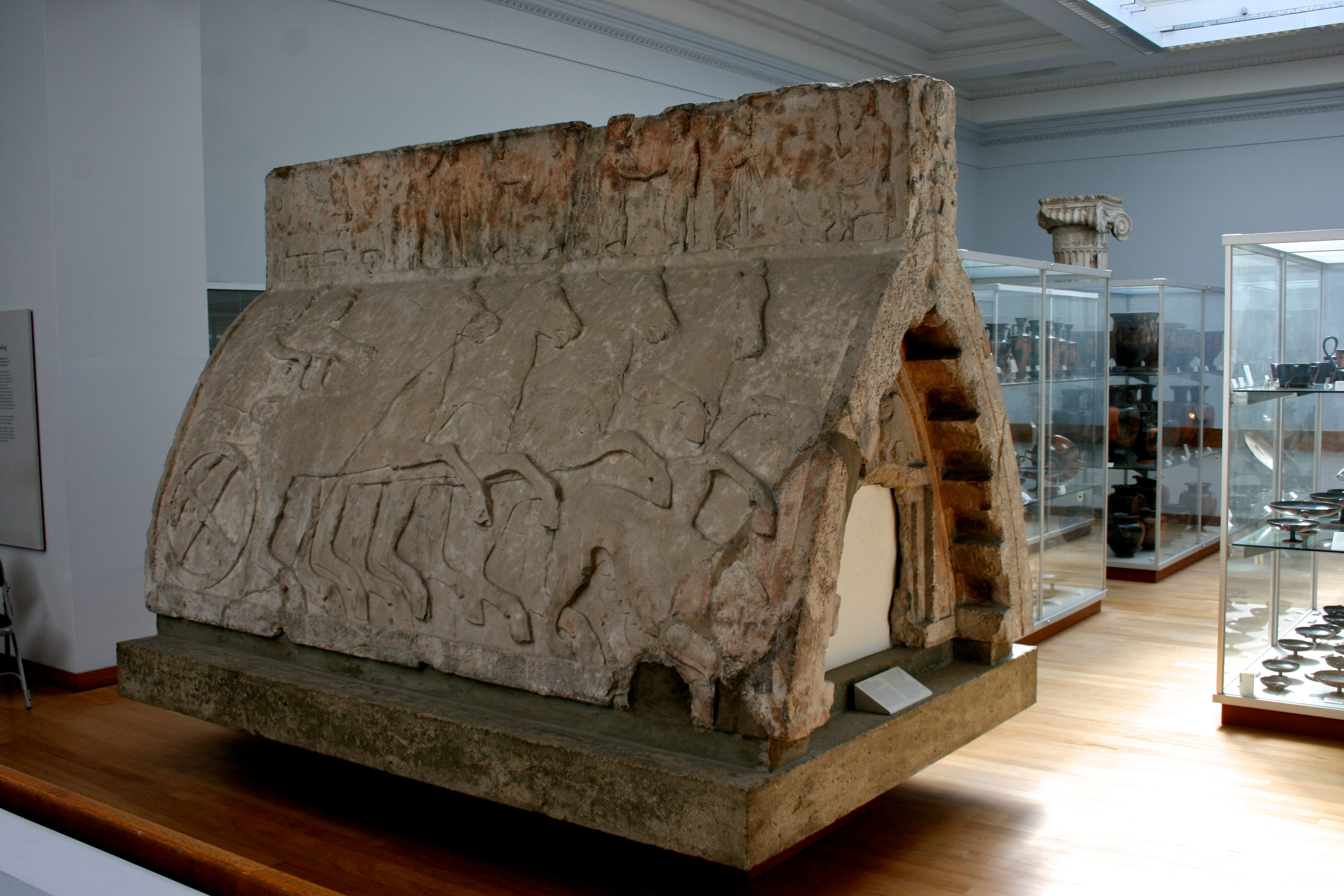
Room 20a – Tomb of Merehi and Greek vases, Lycia, 360 BC

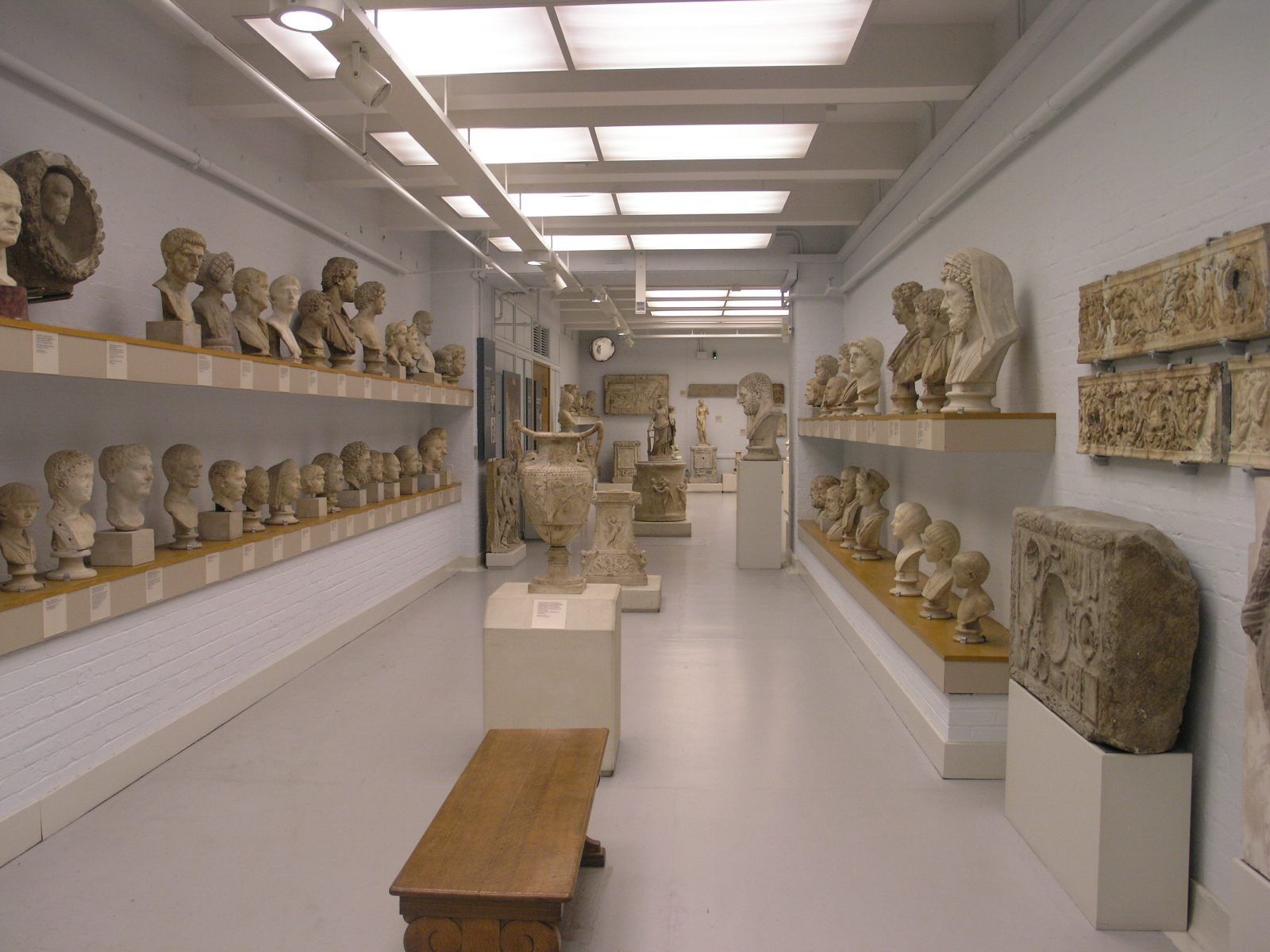
Room 85 – Portrait Sculpture, Roman

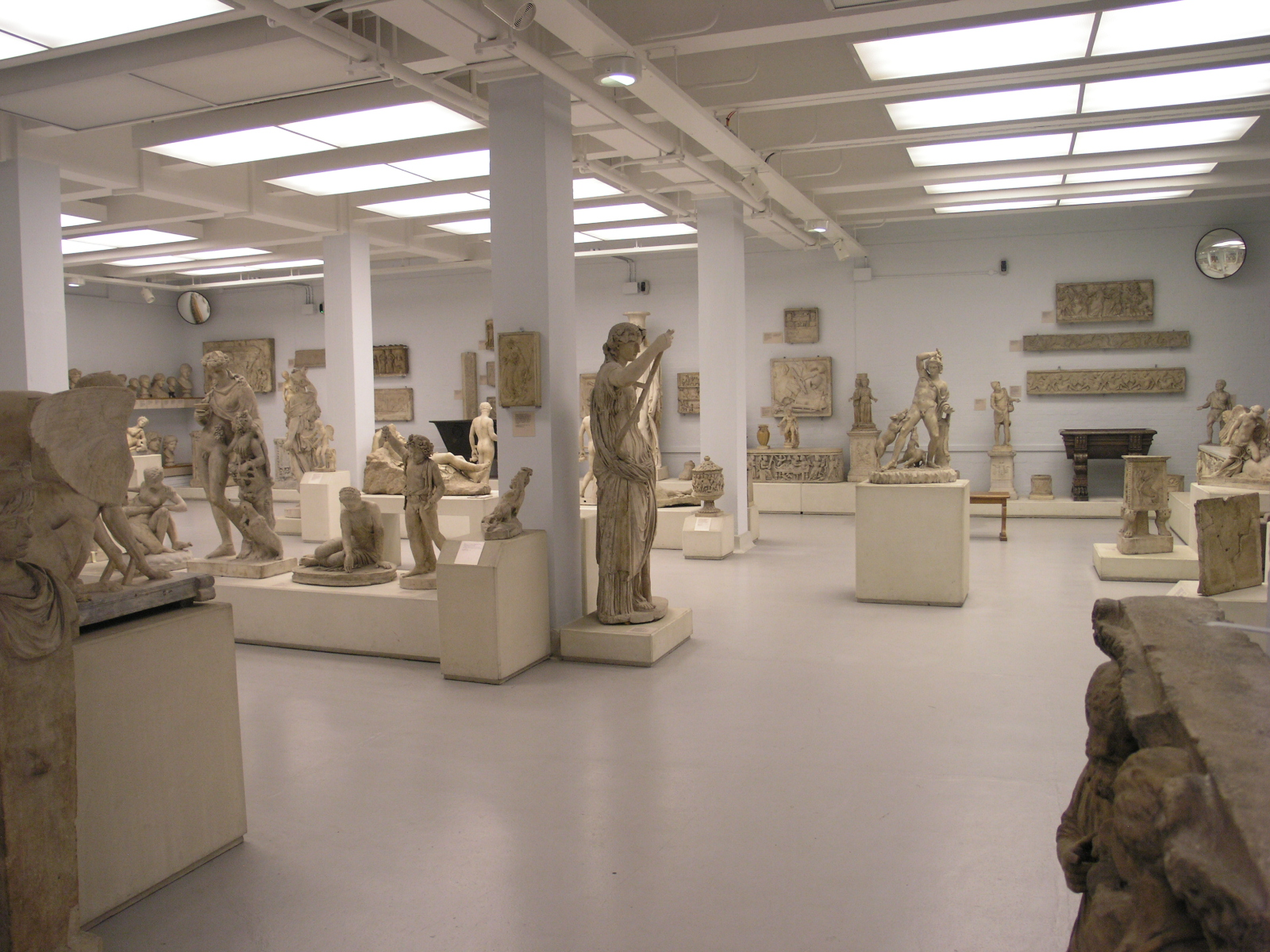
Room 84 – Towneley Roman Sculptures

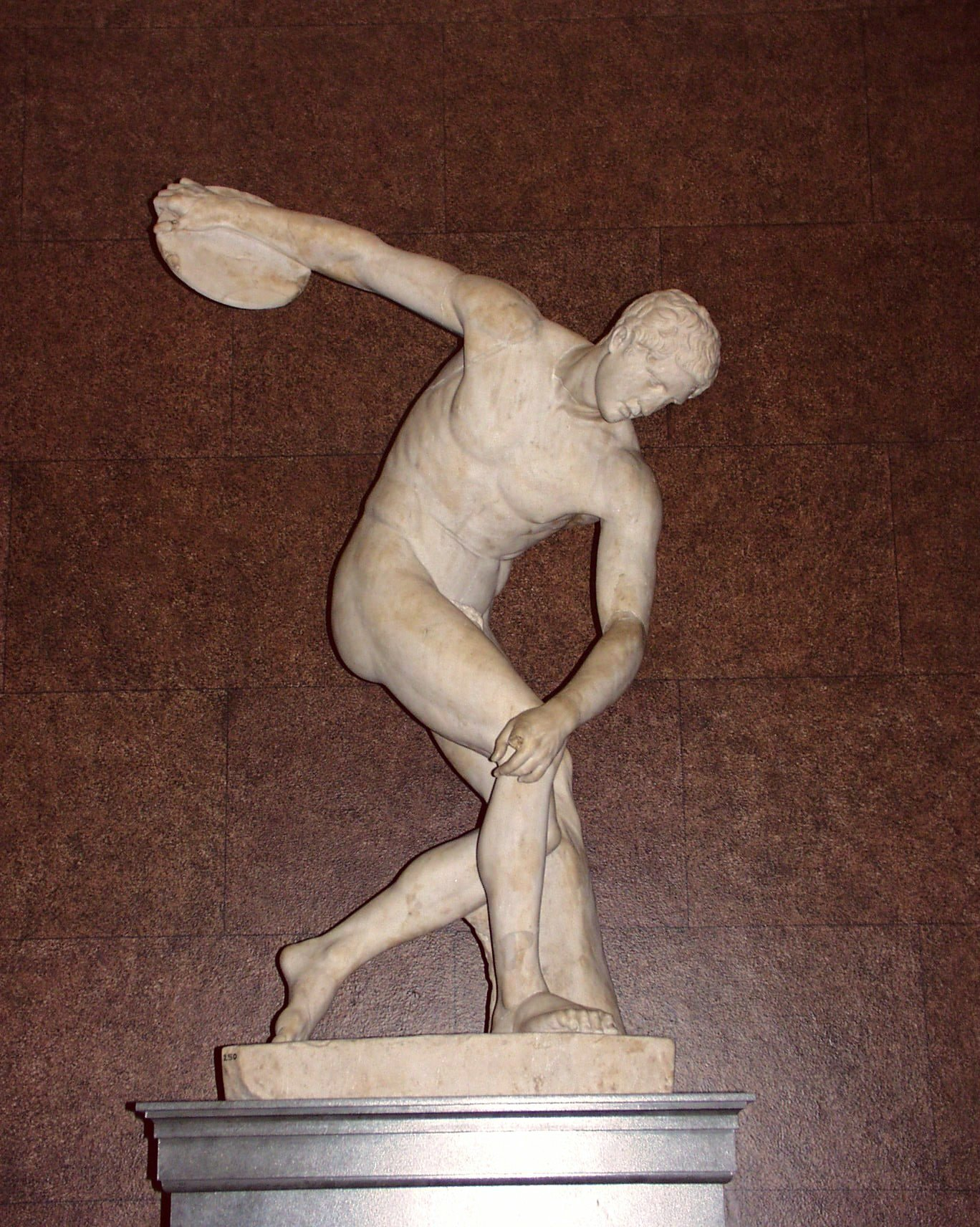
Main Staircase – Discobolus, Roman

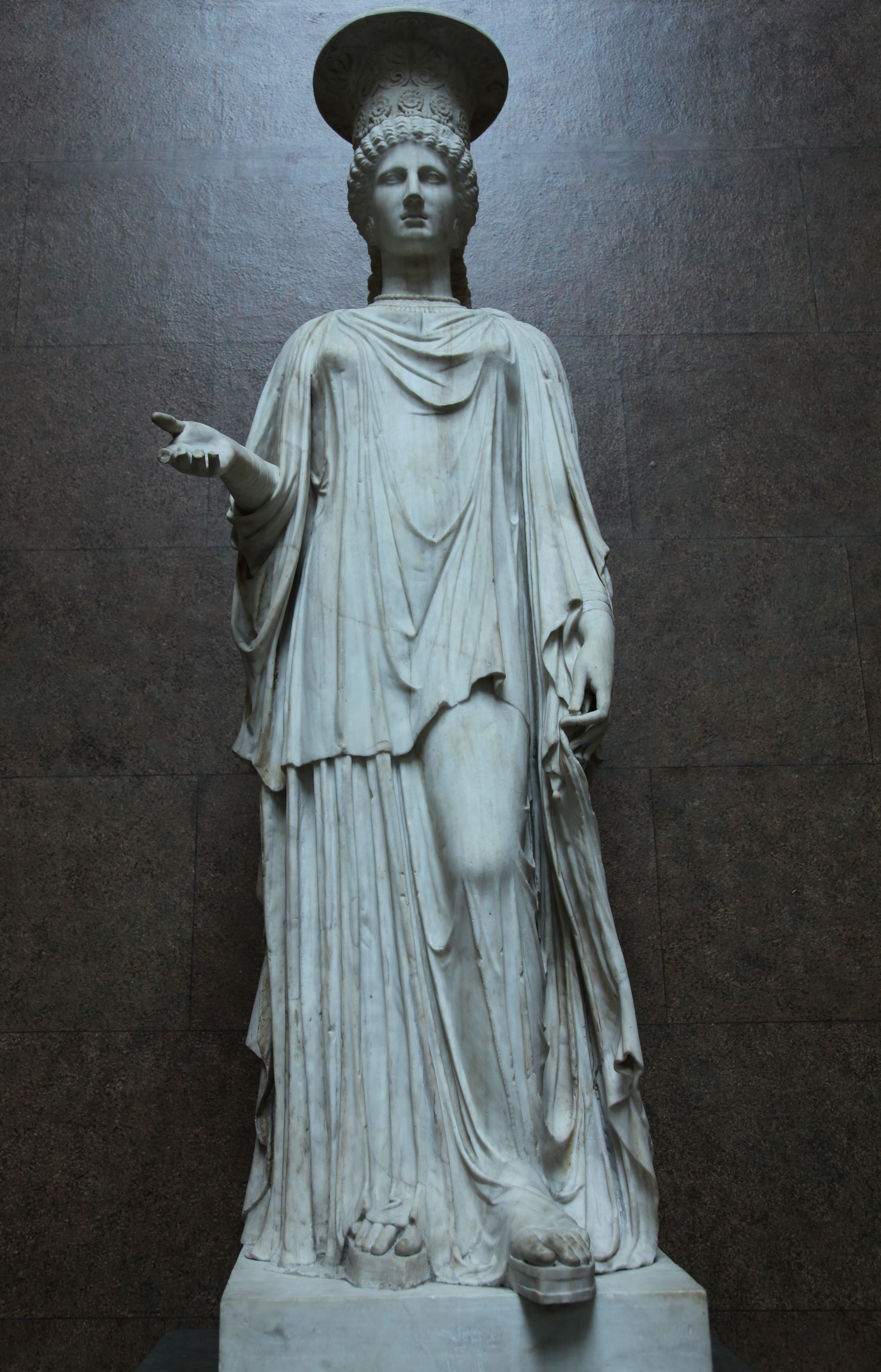
Main Staircase – Townley Caryatid, Roman, 140–160 AD

=== Digital and online ===
The museum has a collaboration with the Google Cultural Institute to bring the collection online.

== Temporary exhibitions ==
The British Museum has hosted a number of temporary exhibitions. A Chronology of Temporary Exhibitions at the British Museum by Joanna Bowring lists all temporary exhibitions from 1838 to 2012. The British Museum website also lists past exhibitions from 2018 onwards.

Between 1972 and 1981, the British Museum hosted the Treasures of Tutankhamun exhibition, displaying artefacts loaned from the Cairo Museum. It was the most popular exhibition in the museum's history, with over 30,000 people visiting in its first week. It is considered a landmark achievement in Egypt–United Kingdom relations.

The museum's Department of Money and Medals holds temporary exhibitions in a gallery space.

From September 2005 January 2006, the museum hosted the exhibition Forgotten Empire: The World of Ancient Persia, presenting the history, art and culture of the Achaemenid Persian Empire.

From January to April 2012 the museum presented Hajj: Journey to the Heart of Islam, the first major exhibition on the topic of the Hajj, the pilgrimage that is one of the five pillars of Islam.

I am Ashurbanipal king of the world, king of Assyria was an exhibition held in 2018-2019, telling the story of the 7th century BC King of Assyria, Ashurbanipal.

The Bayeux Tapestry was loaned to the British Museum by the French Ministry of Culture for an exhibition running from September 2026 to July 2027. Online ticket sales were in high demand, and sold out in hours.

Temporary exhibitions

Crowds attending the Tutankhamun in 1972

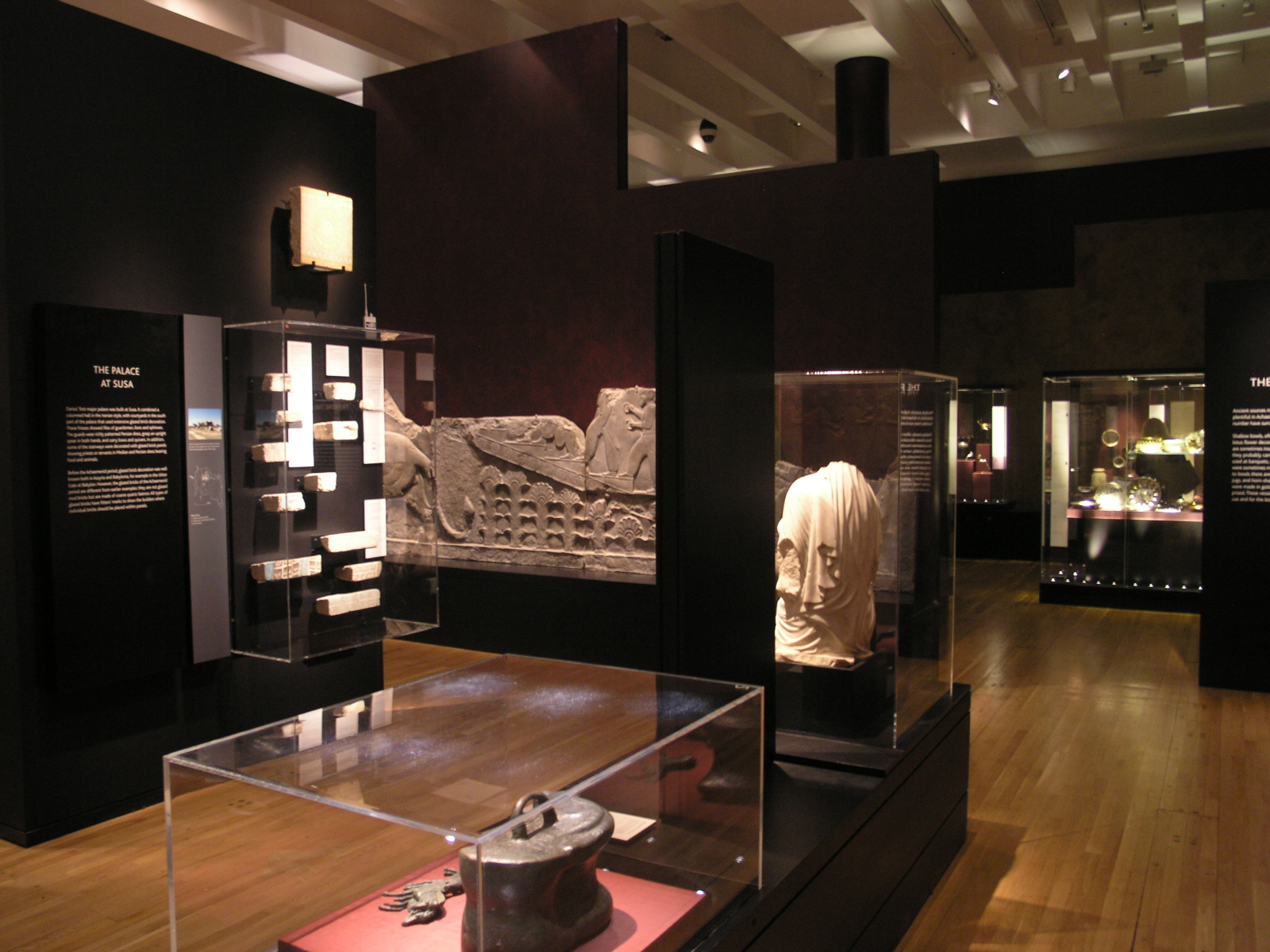
Forgotten Empire Exhibition (2005 2006)

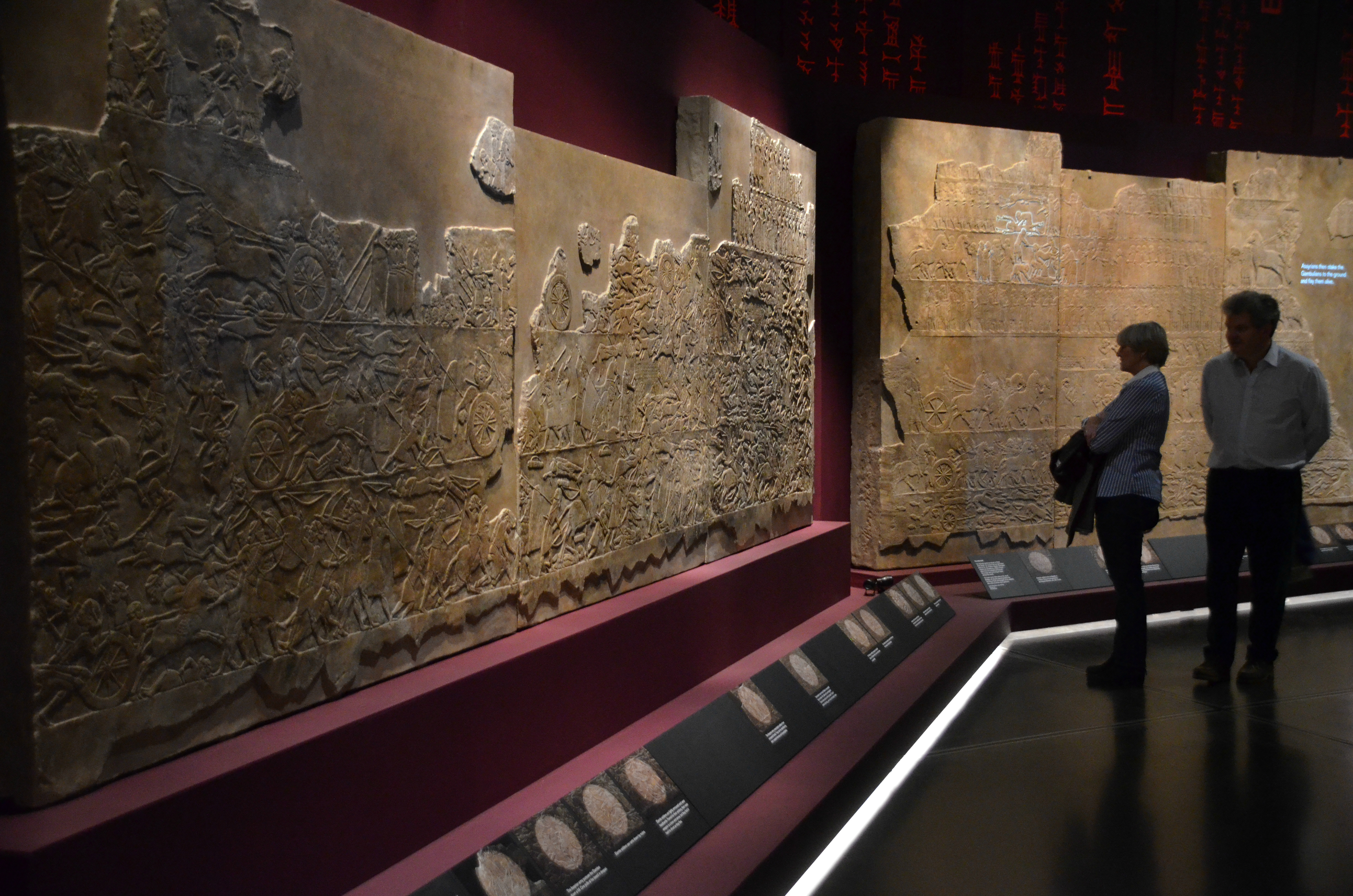
I am Ashurbanipal exhibition (2018)

The Bayeux Tapestry display (2026)

== See also ==
- 2016–17 all-female UK terror plot – involved a plan to attack the British Museum
