= Beaurains Treasure =

Roman hoard

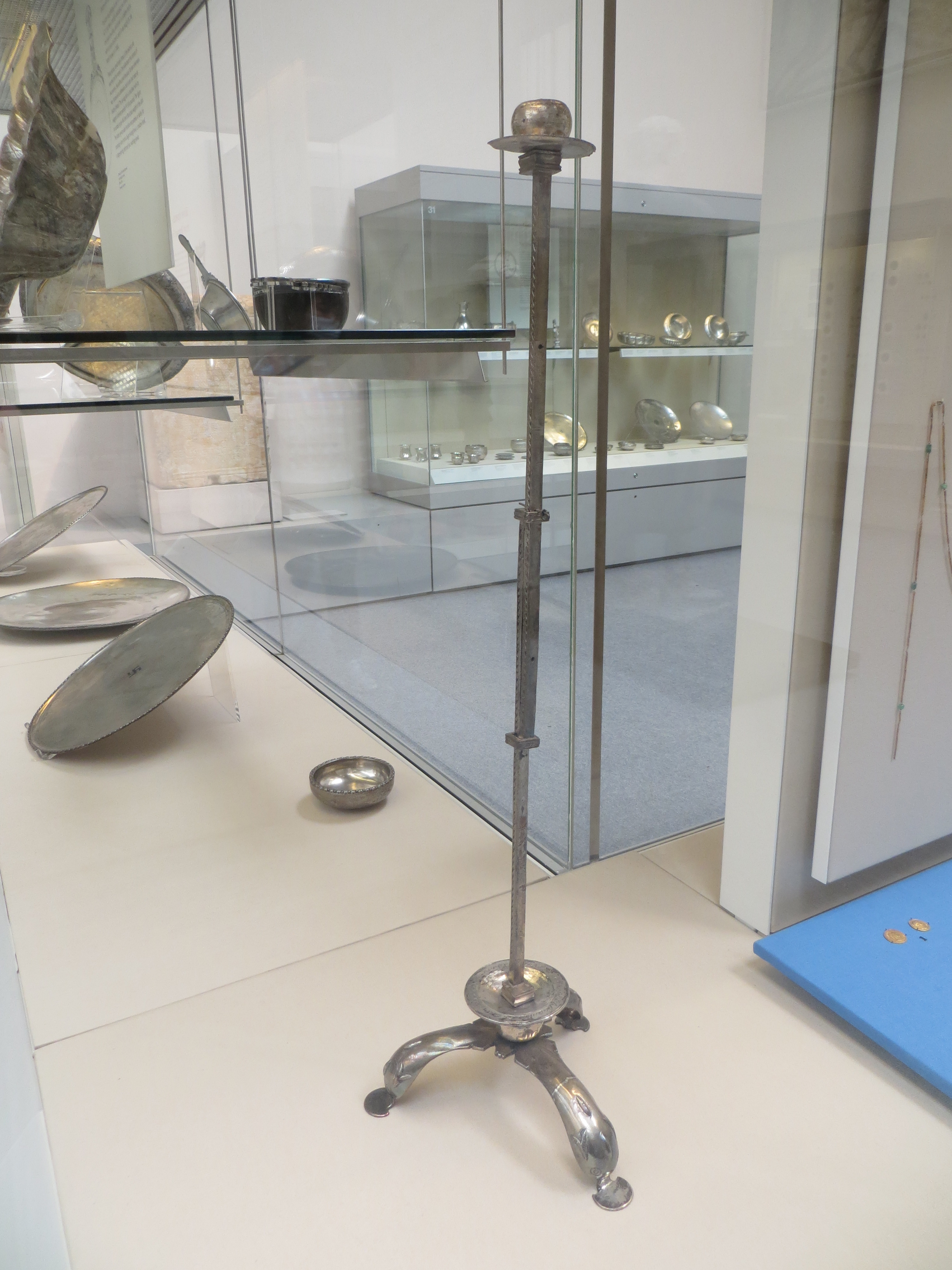
- The candelabra from the Beaurains Treasure as displayed in the British Museum
- Material: Silver
- Created: 3rd century AD
- Discovered: Beaurains, France
- Present location: British Museum, London

The Beaurains Treasure (or Arras Treasure) is the name of an important Roman hoard found in Beaurains, a suburb of the city of Arras, northern France in 1922. Soon after its discovery, much of the treasure was dispersed, to be sold on the antiquities market. The largest portion of the hoard can be found in the local museum in Arras and in the British Museum.

== Discovery ==
The treasure was discovered inside a pottery vessel during building work at Beaurains, Pas-de-Calais on 21 September 1922. Two Belgian workmen were digging for clay when they unearthed the treasure a short depth underground. Unfortunately, much of the treasure disappeared overnight and a great part of it was sold on the antiquities market. Items from the Beaurains Treasure are now found in collections worldwide, but the two institutions with the greatest proportions of the hoard are the Musée d'Arras and the British Museum.

== Description ==
The Beaurains Treasure is principally composed of coins, although other luxury items are included in the hoard. There are twenty-three pieces of jewellery (necklaces, bracelets, earrings, buckles, finger rings, cameos and pendants), silver objects (a lamp stand or candelabra, two spoons and an ingot) and 472 coins that were kept in a (now lost) silver container, including at least 25 gold medallions issued during the reign of Constantine I. The medallions were minted in Trier and Rome and were probably gifts received by the owner of the treasure during his career as officer of the imperial army between 285 and 310 A.D. Their value ranges from four to ten aurei, and from one and a half to nine solidi. One of the medallions was issued to celebrate the reconquest of Britannia by Constantius I in 296 A.D, the reverse of which is denoted by an image of Londinium, represented by a woman welcoming the Emperor on her knees outside the city walls. The original is kept in Arras, with a copy in the British Museum.

== See also ==
- Chaourse Treasure
- Caubiac Treasure
- Chatuzange Treasure
- Mâcon Treasure

== Gallery ==
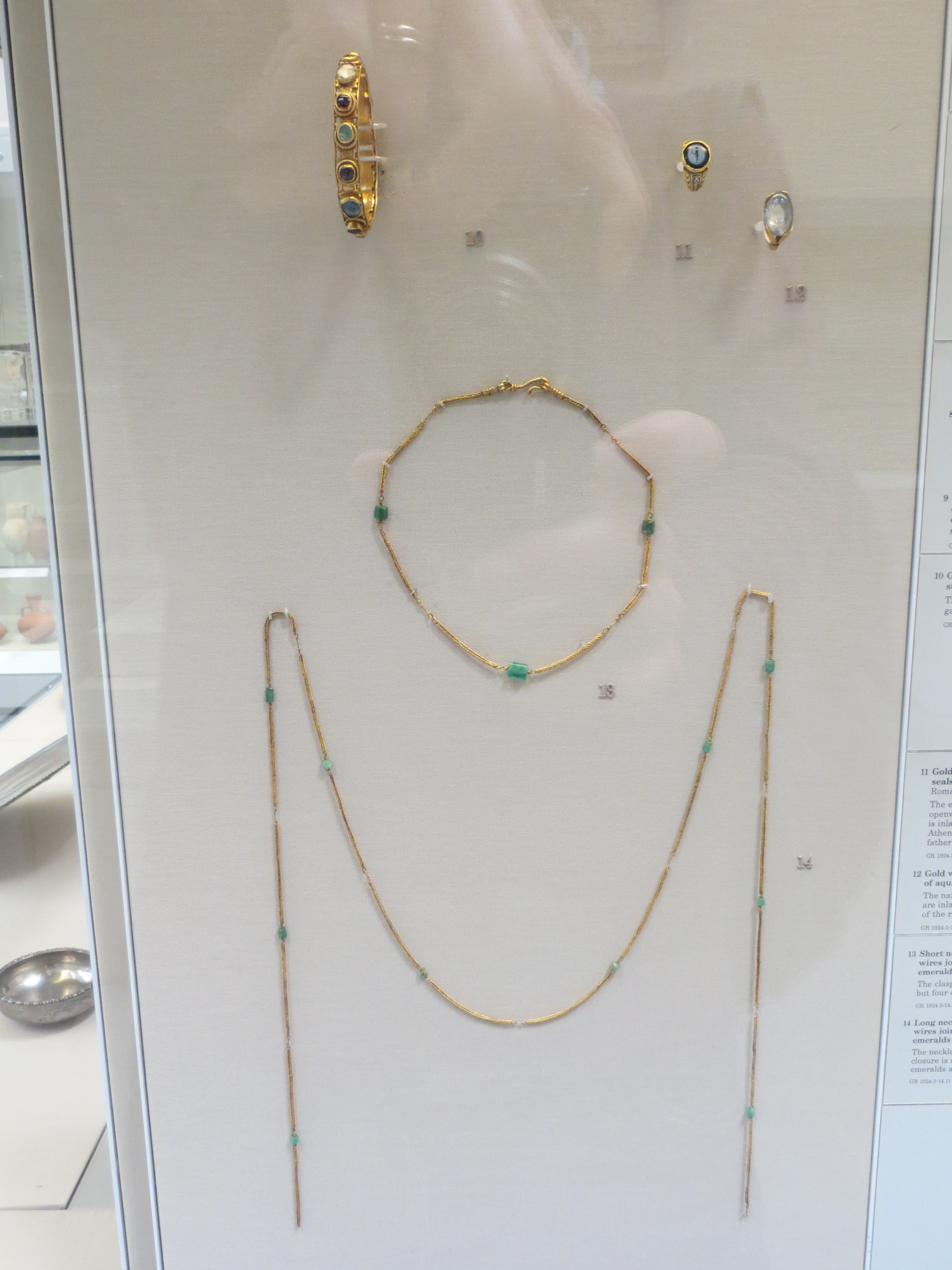
Various necklaces and bracelets from the treasure displayed in the British Museum

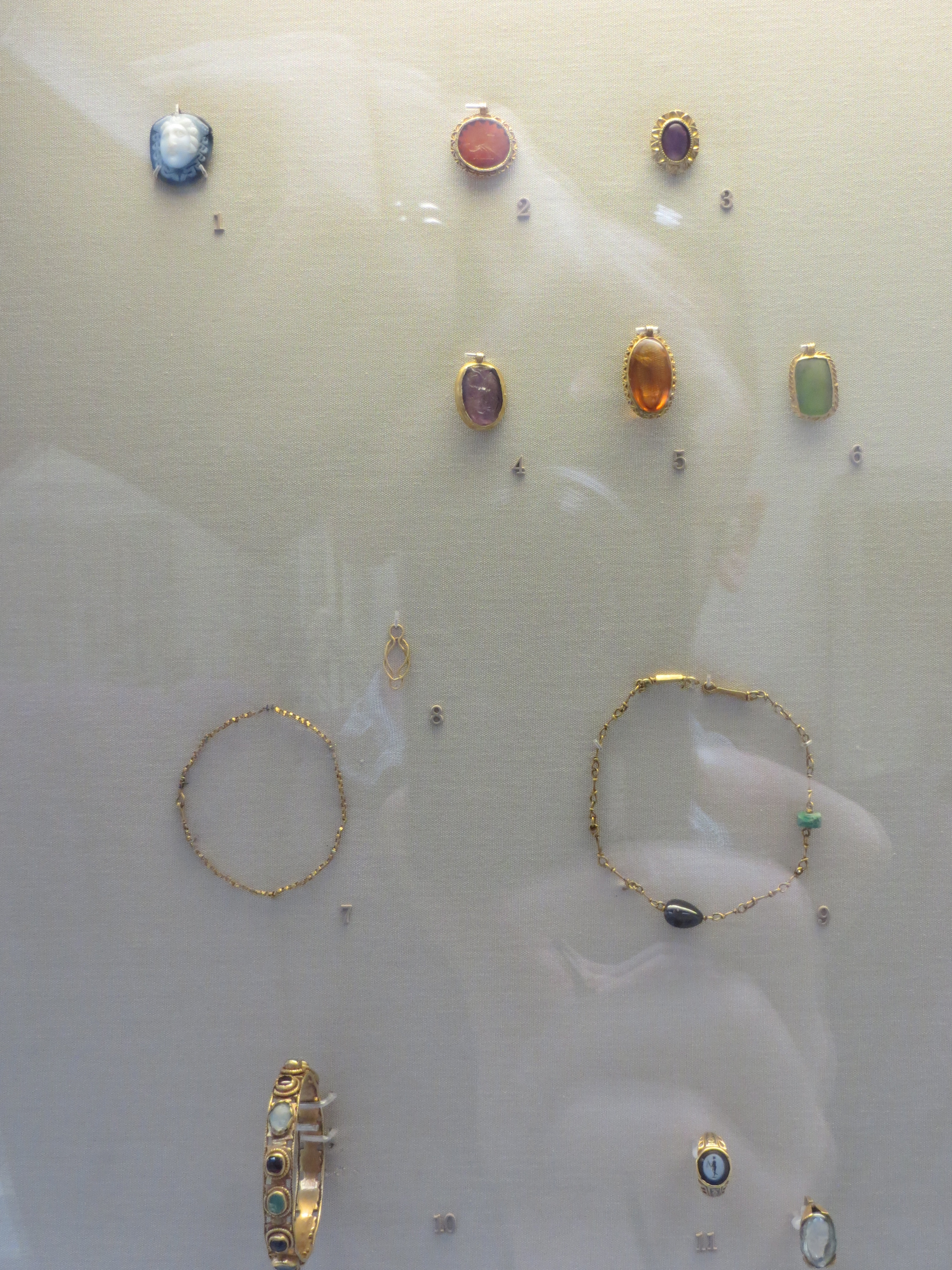
Bracelets, cameos and pendants inset with precious stones

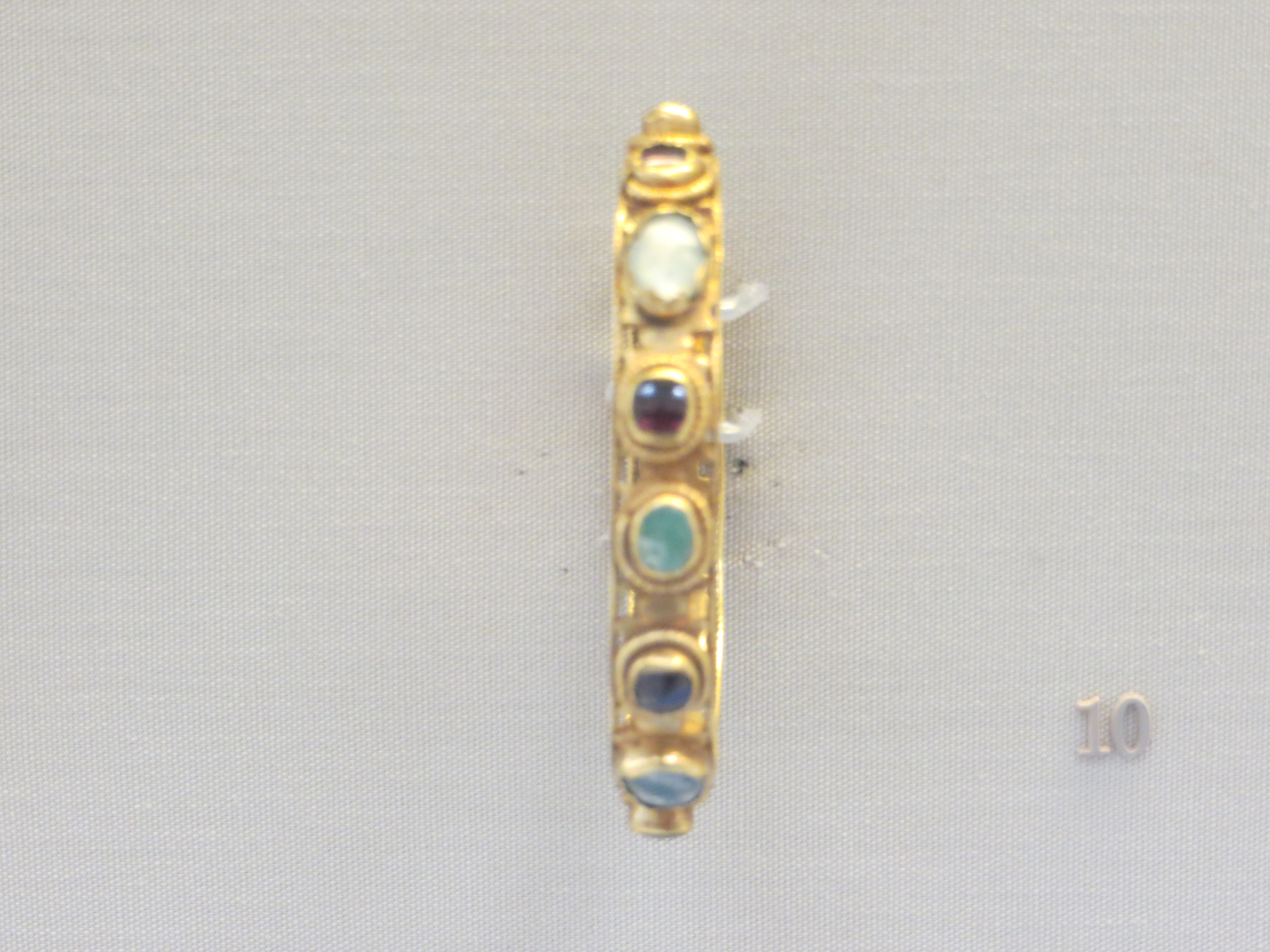
Detail of one of the bracelets set with emeralds, garnets, amethysts and glass

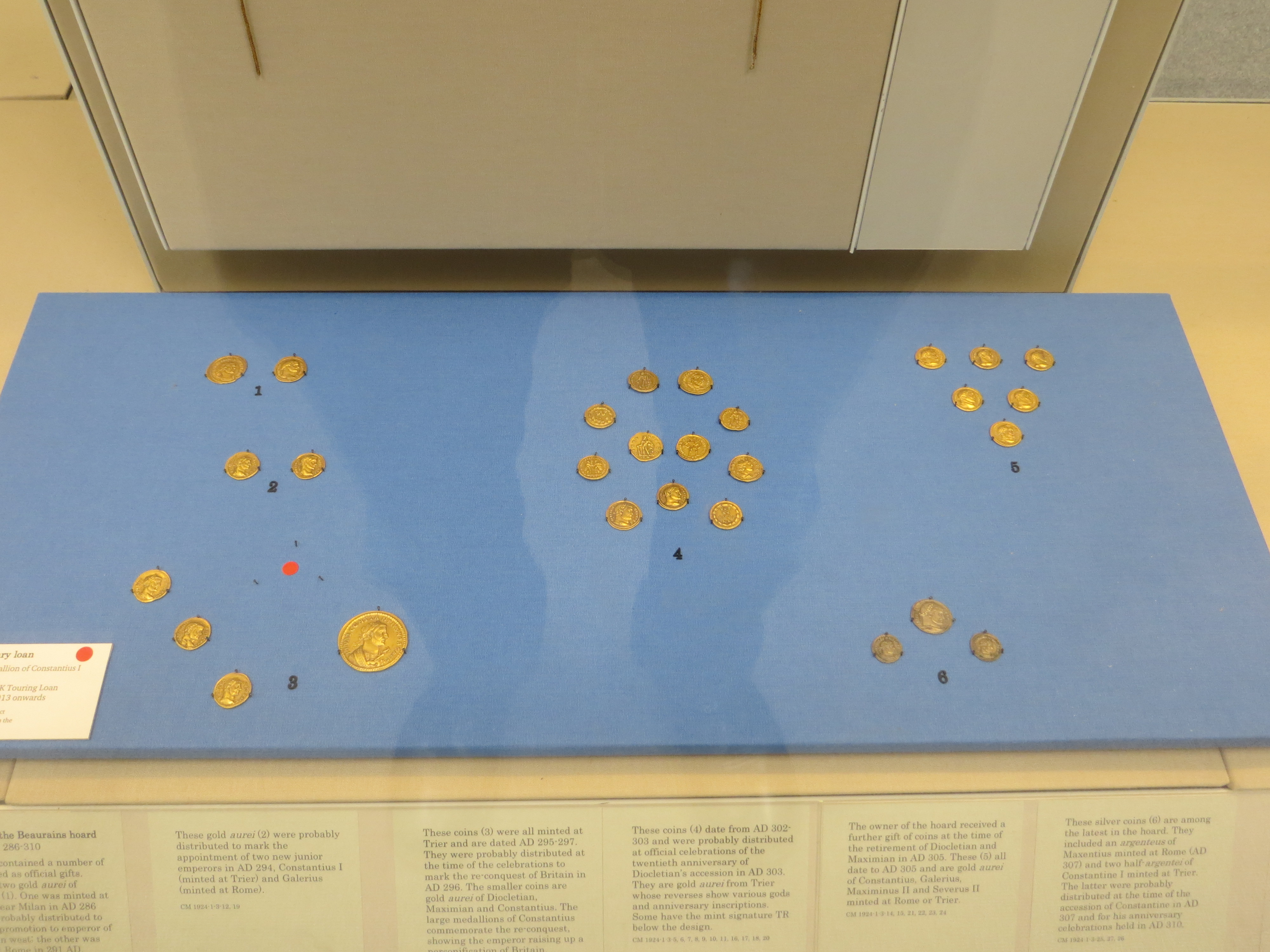
Gold and silver coins and one of the gold medallions from the find

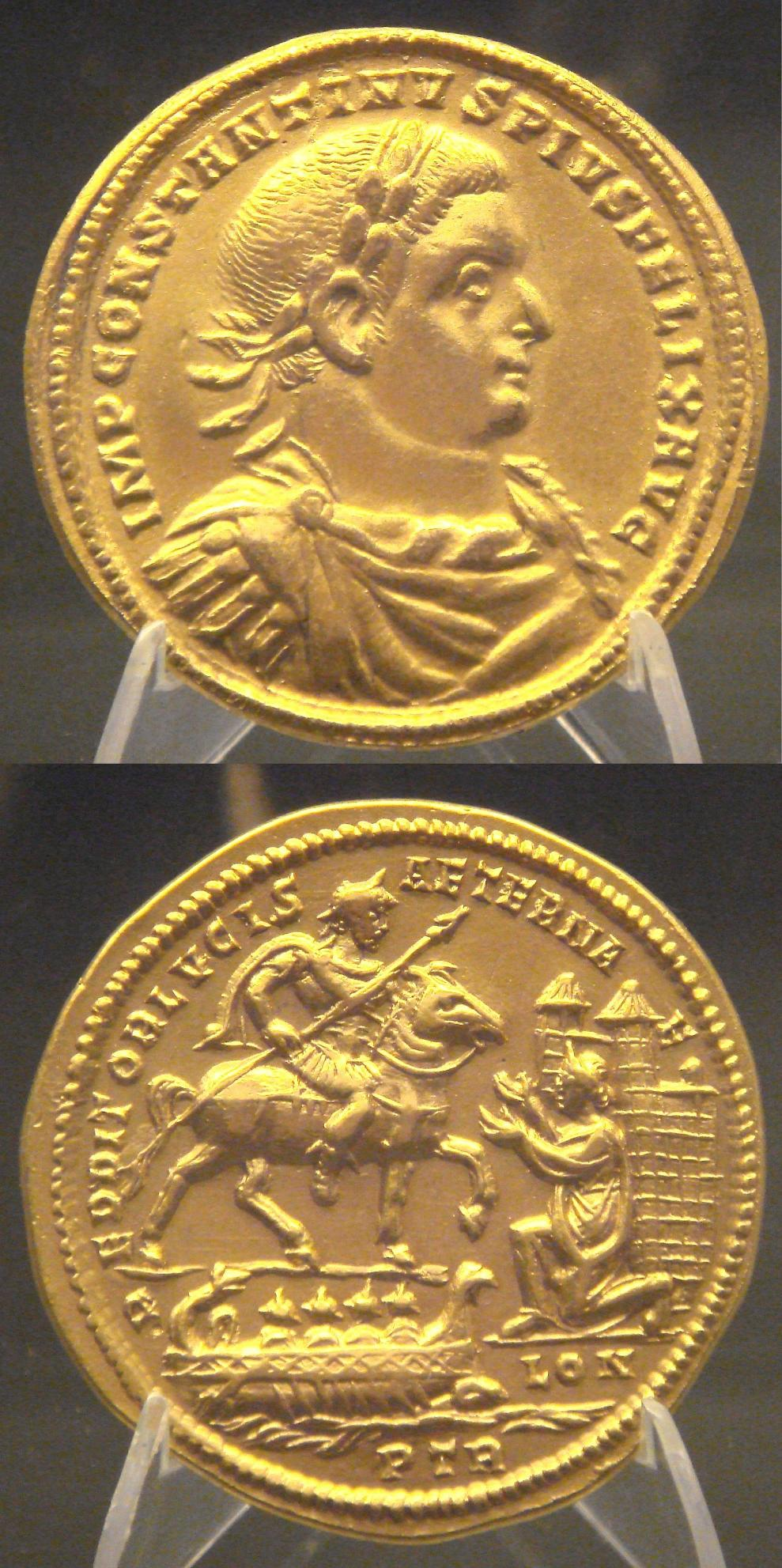
Copy of the famous gold medallion of Constantius Chlorus capturing London, in the British Museum
