= Caubiac Treasure =

Roman hoard

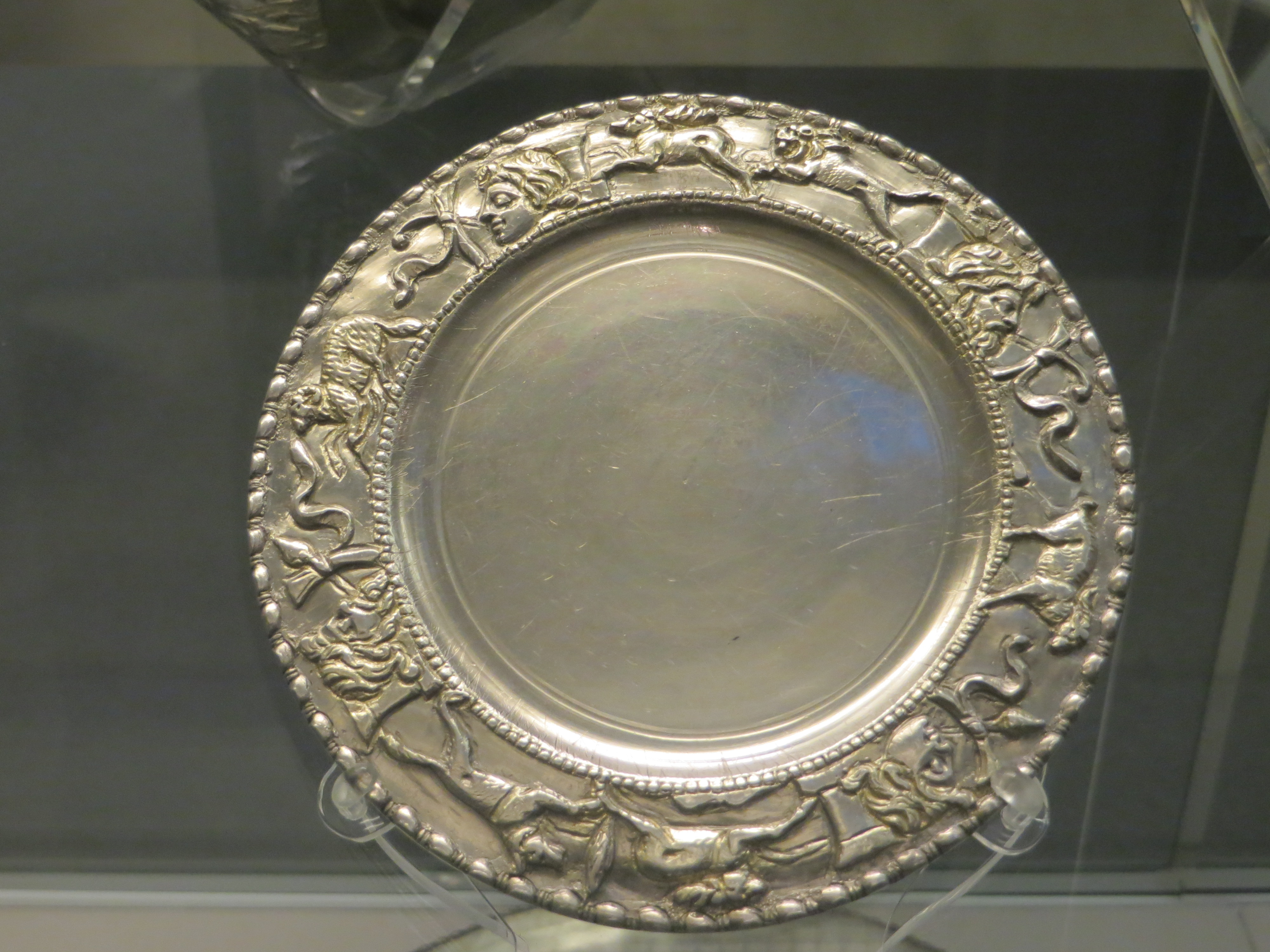
- Saucer from the Caubiac Treasure displayed in the British Museum
- Material: Silver
- Size: 14 cm in diameter
- Created: 3rd Century AD
- Present location: British Museum, London

The Caubiac Treasure is a Roman silver hoard found in the village of Thil, southern France in 1785 that is now kept in the British Museum in London.

== Discovery ==
In May 1785 a farmer allegedly discovered seven silver objects in a field near the village of Caubiac, in the Haute-Garonne department of southwestern France. Five years later the complete treasure was sold to the English collector Richard Payne Knight, who bequeathed it to the British Museum in 1824.

== Provenance of the Find ==
For many years the hoard was assumed to have been discovered in Caubiac. However, in 1988 scholars challenged the original provenance of the find. According to handwritten records kept at the Academy of Toulouse, the treasure was actually found at the nearby village of Thil. The error appears to have originated from the fact that the owner of the field where the treasure was found lived in Caubiac, while the field itself was located in the town of Thil, on the site of an ancient castle named Mouillat.

== Description ==
The entire hoard is made of silver. It includes a saucer and three dishes, some of which are decorated with Bacchic scenes, a large plate inscribed with the name 'Benignus', an ornamented cup and a (now badly damaged) fluted bowl with a central medallion of Venus with Cupid and Priapus, which was used for washing hands. The whole set dates from between the late 2nd century and the early 3rd century and probably served to celebrate the cult of Bacchus. At the base of one of the dishes is inscribed the name 'Benignus Victori Victoris', who was almost certainly the original owner of the treasure. At the foot of the fluted bowl is engraved the name 'Eugrafi' which may refer to a Greek craftsman called Eugraphios, who made the set.

== See also ==
- Chaourse Treasure
- Mâcon Treasure
- Chatuzange Treasure
- Beaurains Treasure

== Gallery ==
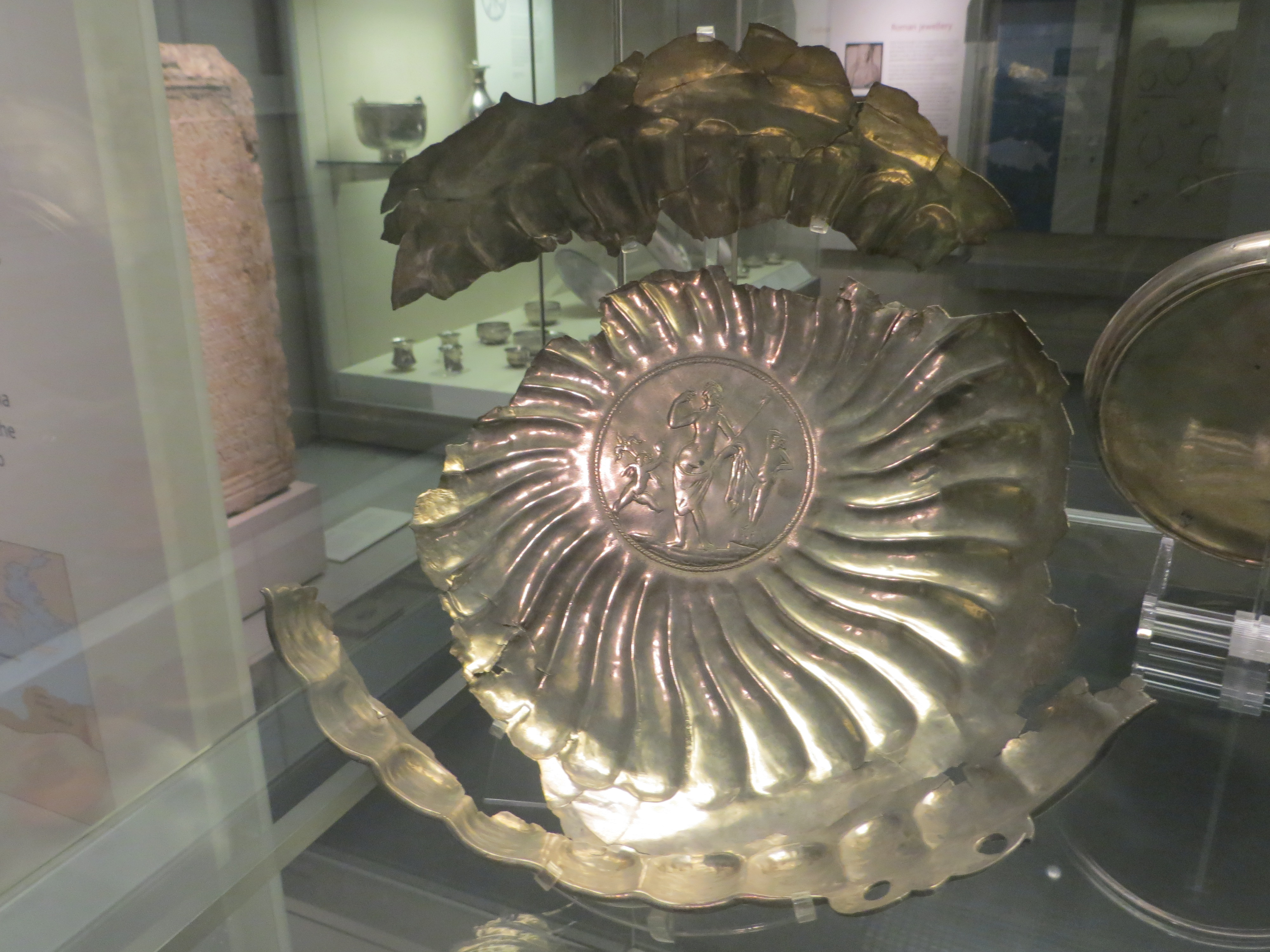
Fluted bowl from the Caubiac Treasure

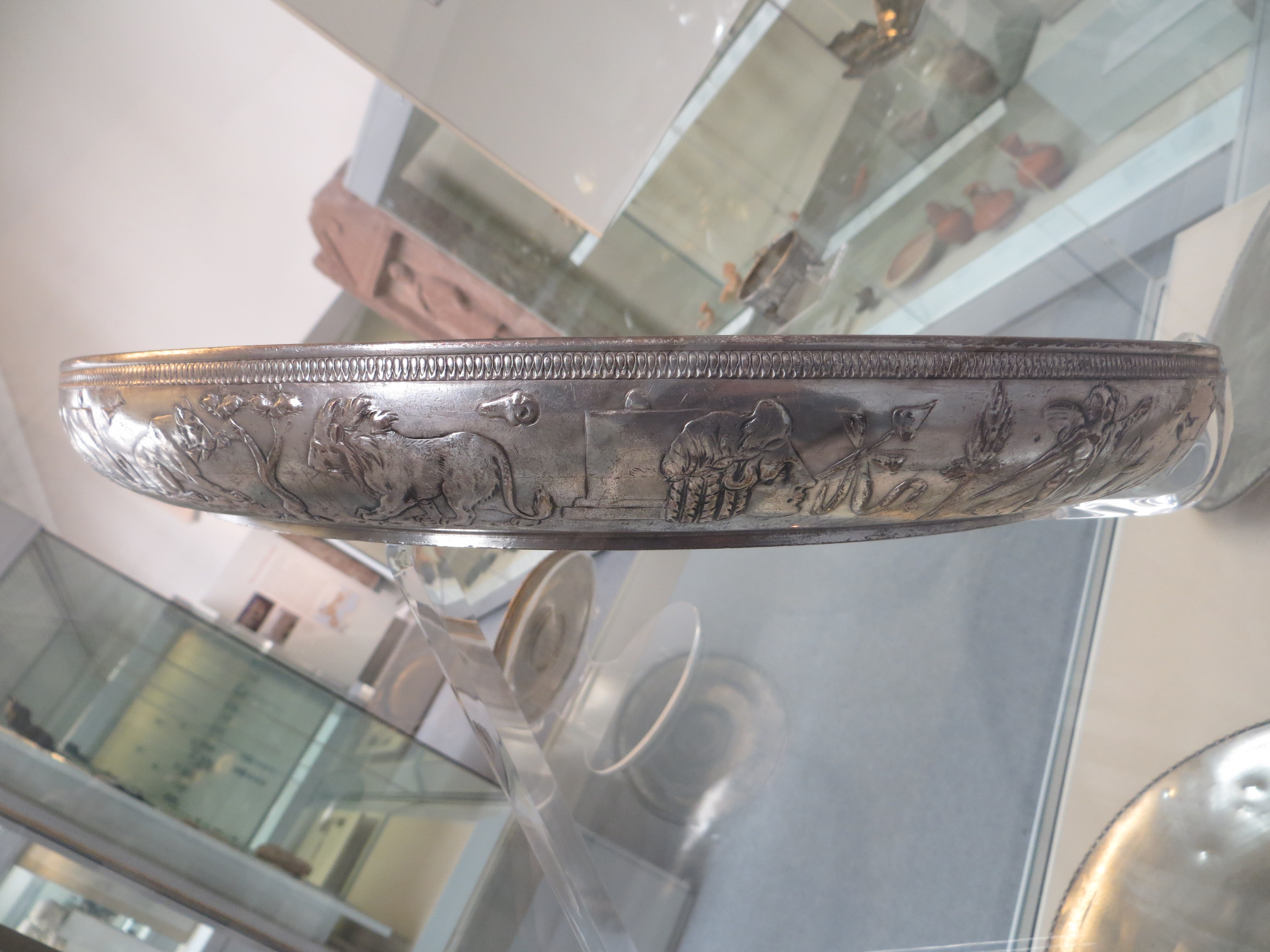
Serving dish with ornamented bacchic scenes around the side

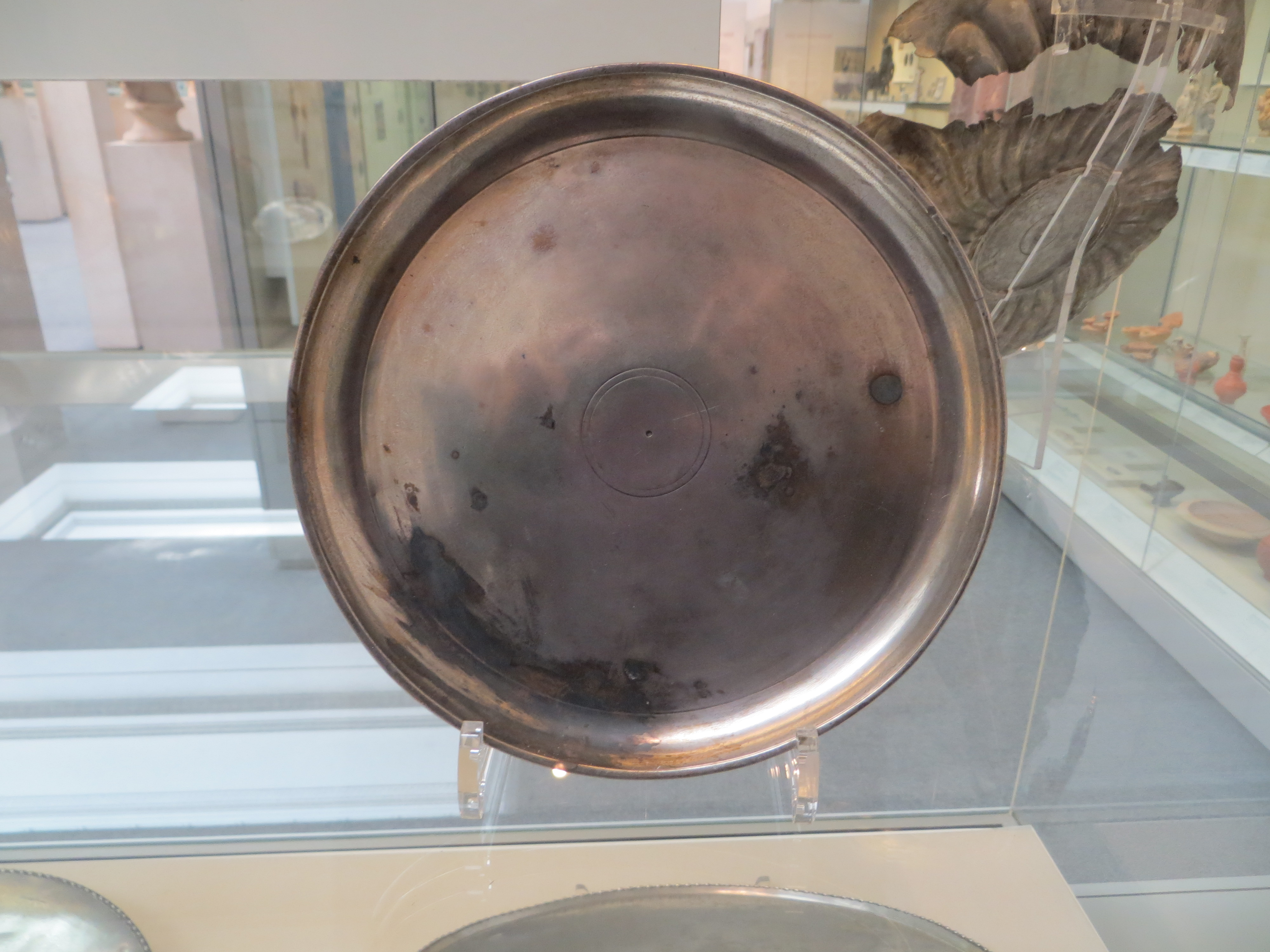
Silver dish with a raised rim

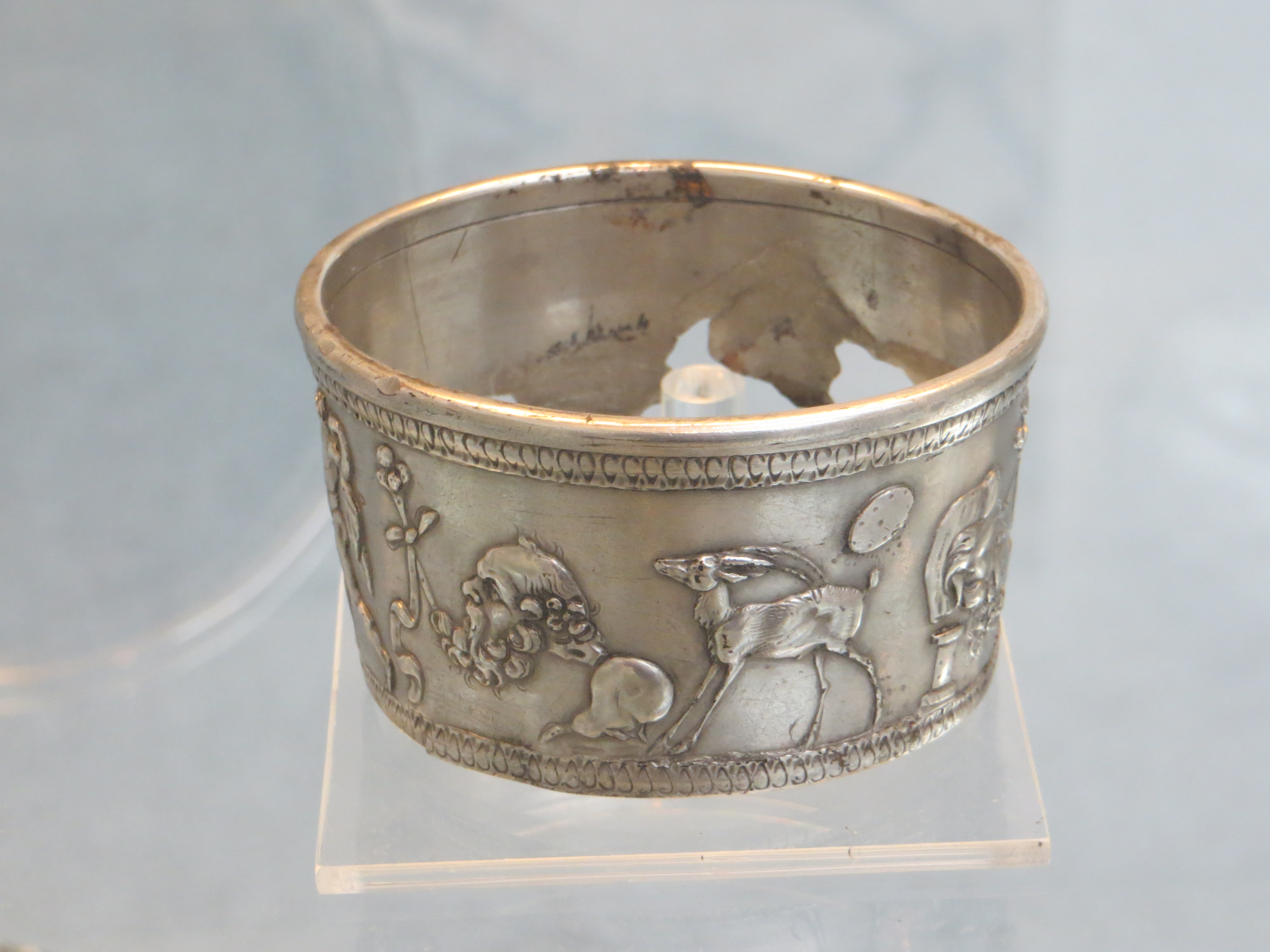
Silver cup with bacchic scenes

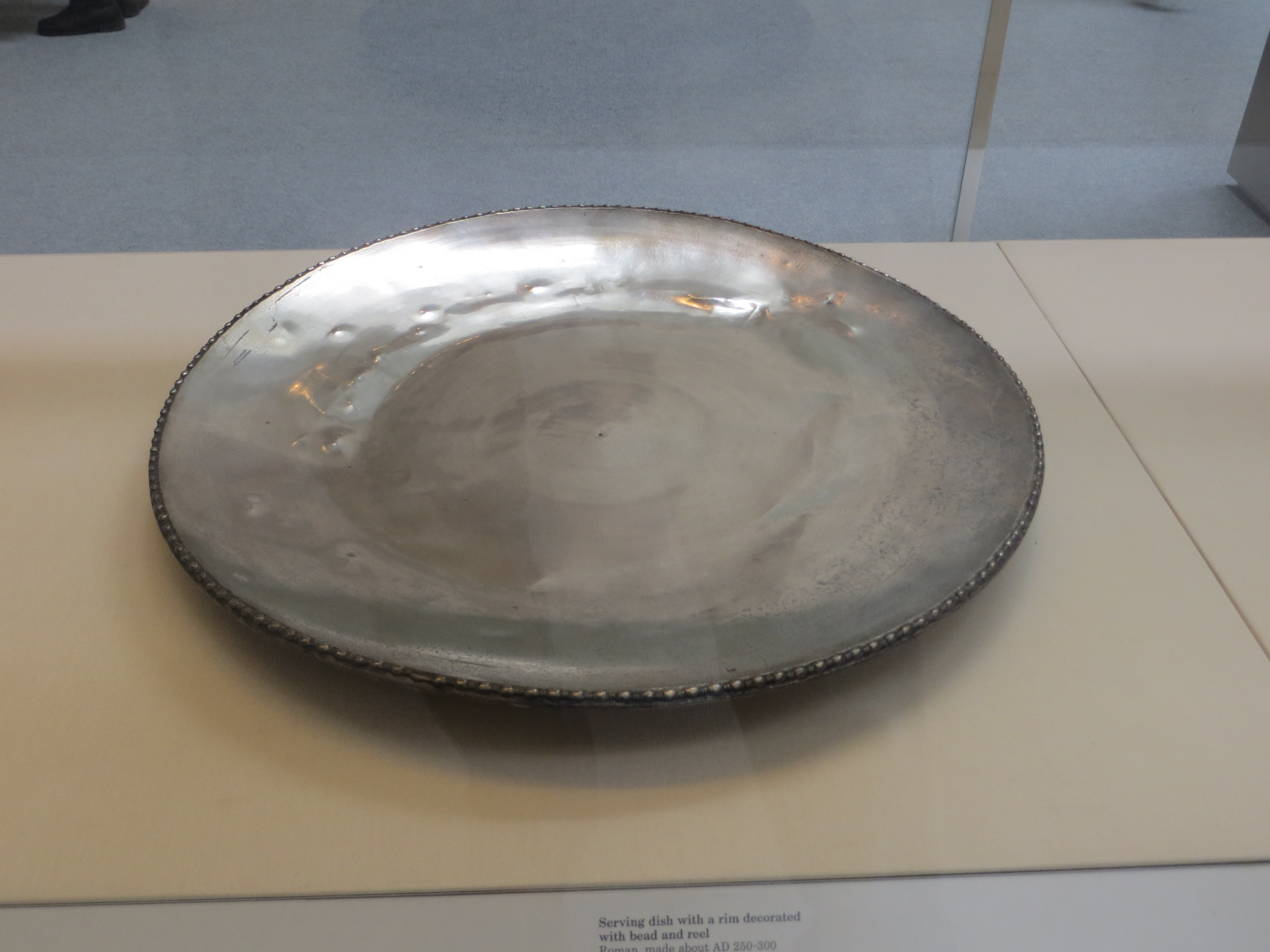
Serving plate with a rim decorated with bead and reel

== Bibliography ==
- D. Strong, Greek and Roman Silver Plate (British Museum Press, 1966)
- L. Burn, The British Museum Book of Greek and Roman Art (British Museum Press, 1991)
- S. Walker, Roman Art (British Museum Press, 1991)
- Boccard (Editor), Le Trésor d'argenterie gallo-romaine de Thil dit le Trésor de Caubiac
