= Caubiac =

- Commune
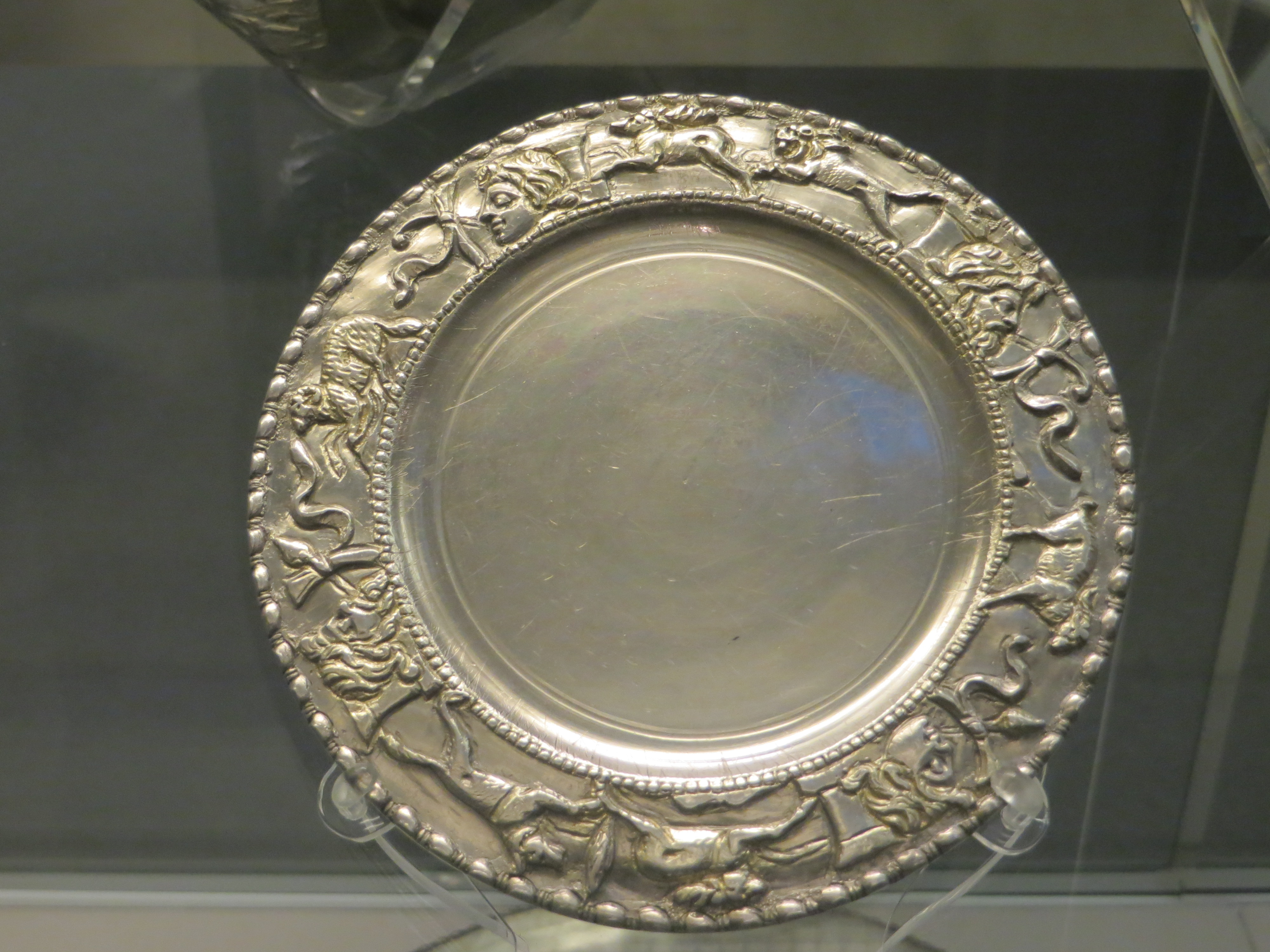
- Small silver plate from the Caubiac Treasure
- Location of Caubiac
- Location within France Location within Occitanie
- Coordinates: 43°42′54″N 1°05′10″E
- Country: France
- Region: Occitania
- Department: Haute-Garonne
- Arrondissement: Toulouse
- Canton: Léguevin
- Intercommunality: Hauts Tolosans

Government
  - Mayor (2020–2026): Jacques Lamarque
- Area^{1}: 7.99 km^{2} (3.08 sq mi)
- Elevation: 235 m (771 ft)
- Highest elevation: 275 m (902 ft)
- Lowest elevation: 178 m (584 ft)
- Population (2023): 441
  - Density: 55.2/km^{2} (143/sq mi)
- Time zone: UTC+01:00 (CET)
  - Summer (DST): UTC+02:00 (CEST)
- INSEE/Postal code: 31126 /31480
- ^{1} French Land Register data, which excludes lakes, ponds, glaciers > 1 km^{2} (0.386 sq mi or 247 acres) and river estuaries.

Caubiac (French pronunciation: [kobjak]) is a commune in the Haute-Garonne department in southwestern France. The ancient Gallo-Roman Caubiac Treasure was supposedly found in the village. It is now part of the British Museum's collection but was found in the nearby village of Thil.

== Population ==
Historical population
Year	Pop.	±% p.a.
1968	177	—
1975	158	−1.61%
1982	130	−2.75%
1990	154	+2.14%
1999	193	+2.54%
2007	241	+2.82%
2012	342	+7.25%
2017	382	+2.24%
2023	441	+2.42%
Source: INSEE

== See also ==
- Communes of the Haute-Garonne department
