= Chaourse Treasure =

Roman hoard found in France

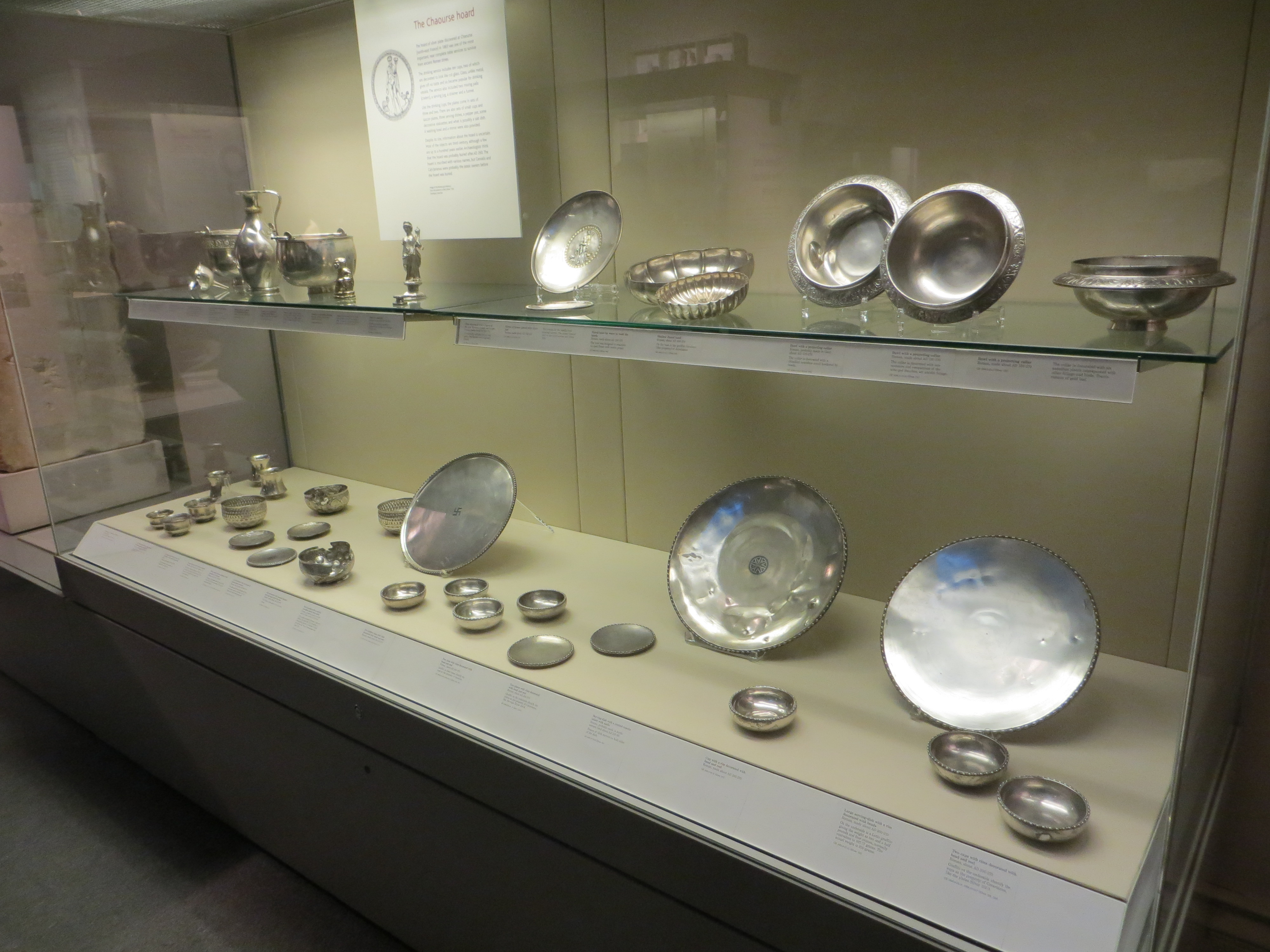
- Chaourse Treasure as displayed in the British Museum
- Material: Silver
- Created: 2nd-3rd century AD
- Present location: British Museum, London

The Chaourse Treasure is a hoard of Roman silver found in Chaourse, a village near Montcornet, Aisne, in northern France in 1883. Dated c. 270 AD, the treasure is one of the most complete table services to survive from antiquity. This important hoard is now part of the British Museum's collection.

== Discovery and ownership ==
The hoard was uncovered by chance in a field near the village of Chaourse and had been deposited wrapped in cloth. Coins were also found with the treasure, the latest dating from the Gallic emperor Postumus. It appears that tableware was buried shortly afterwards, during the reign of Gallienus, although the context of the find remains obscure. While a few of the objects date to the 2nd century, most originate from the 3rd century AD. The names of two people - Genialis and Cavarianus - are inscribed on some silver vessels. They were probably the original owners of the service, who decided to bury the hoard for safe keeping. Six years after its discovery, the entire treasure was purchased by the British Museum.

== Description ==
The Chaourse Treasure is made up of 39 objects in total, all of which are silver, apart from five small vessels and a silvered bronze mirror. There are four large serving platters, one with a swastika in its central medallion, another with a gilded figure of the Roman god Mercury holding his caduceus flanked by a ram and a cockerel. In addition, there are plain silver drinking cups, various jugs, two large situlas, one of which has an acanthus-scroll frieze, shallow plates, hemispherical bowls (one of which was used for washing hands), flanged and fluted bowls (some with engraved decoration of animals amid floral patterns), some mirrors, an ornate strainer with floral and geometric designs, a statuette of the deity Fortuna and a pepper-pot in the shape of an African slave-boy.

== See also ==
- Mâcon Treasure
- Caubiac Treasure
- Chatuzange Treasure
- Berthouville Treasure
- Beaurains Treasure
- Ruffieu Treasure

== Gallery ==
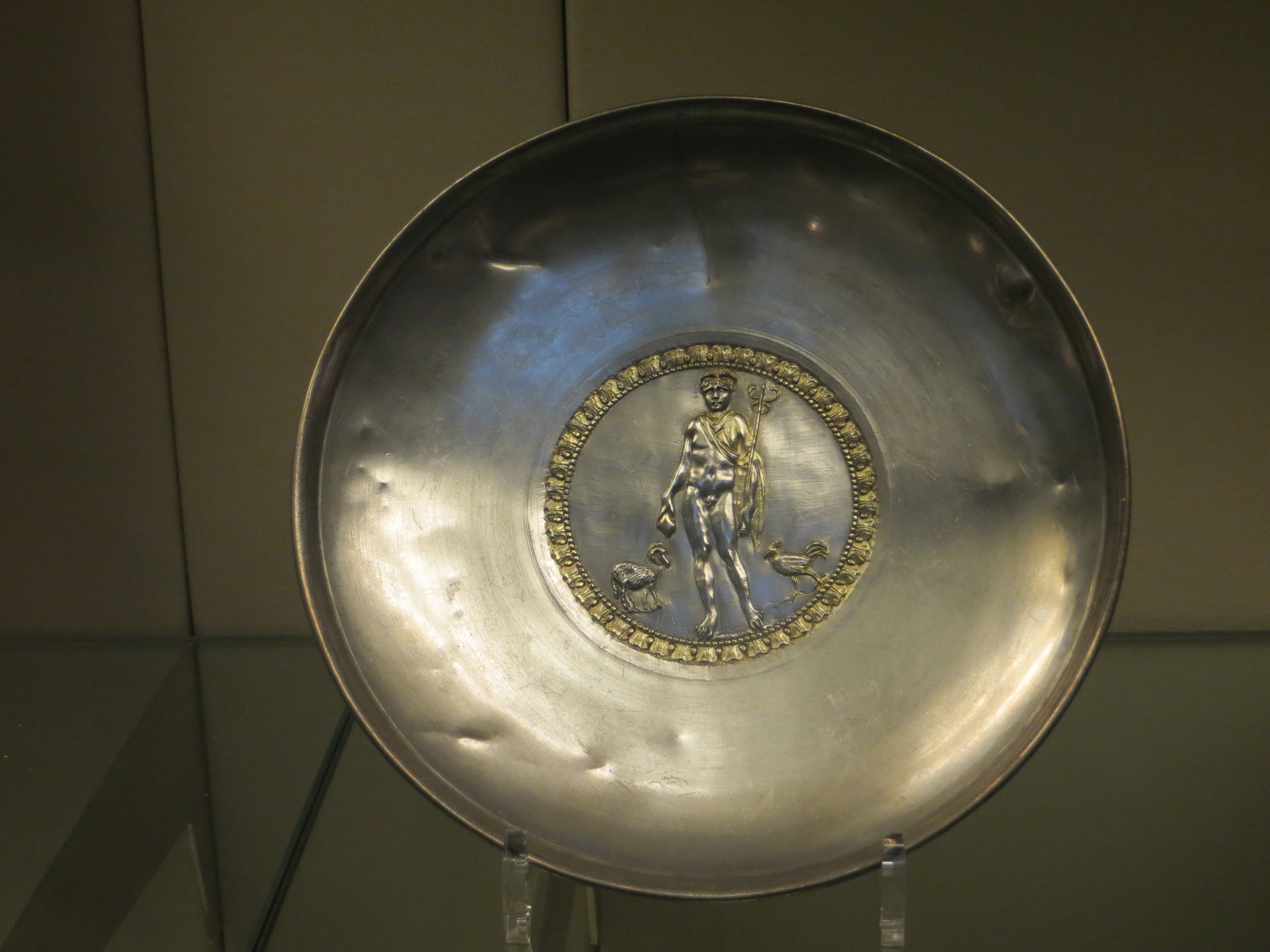
Silver plate with the figure of Mercury in the central roundel

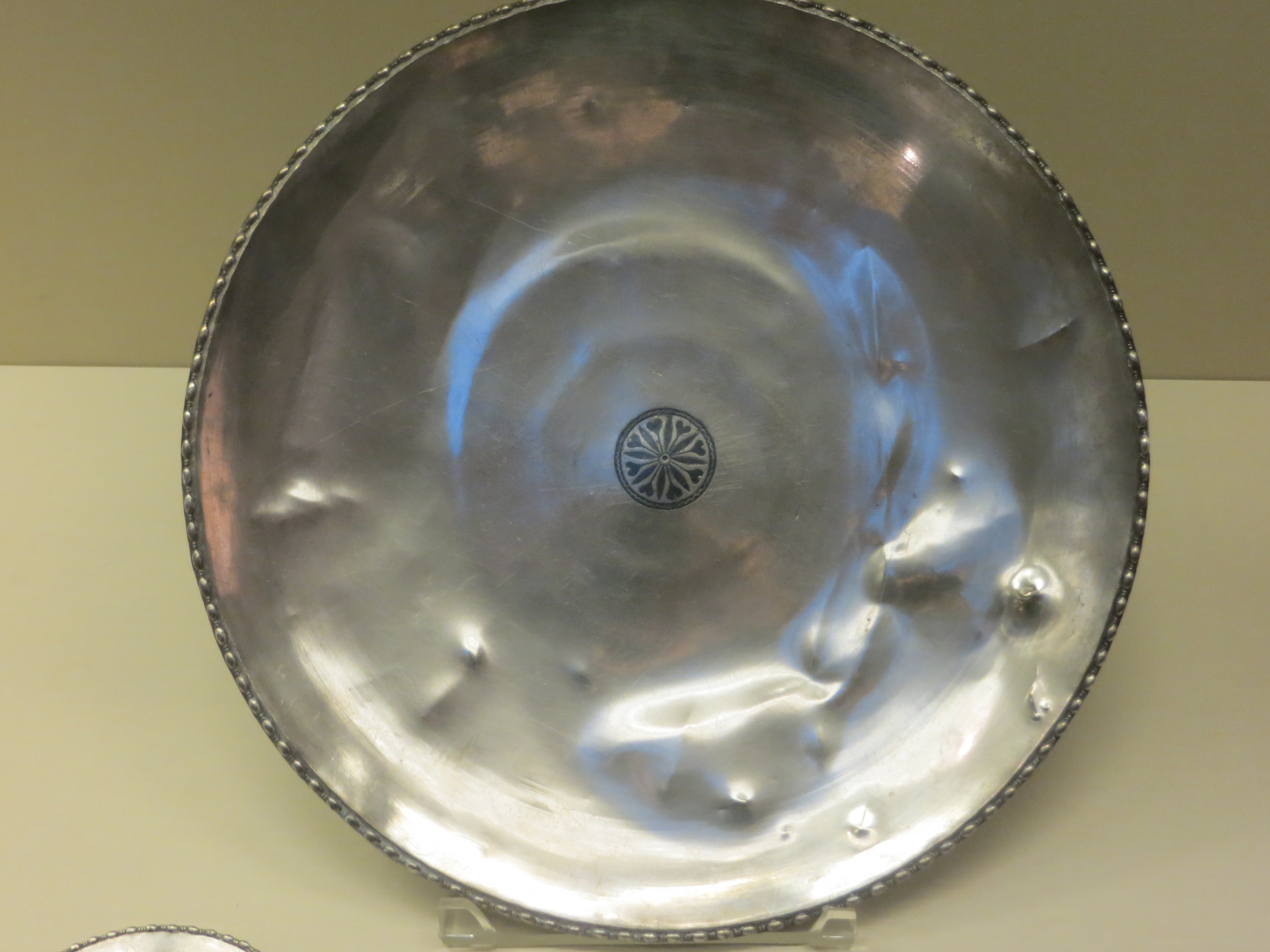
Platter with a six leafed star pattern in the centre

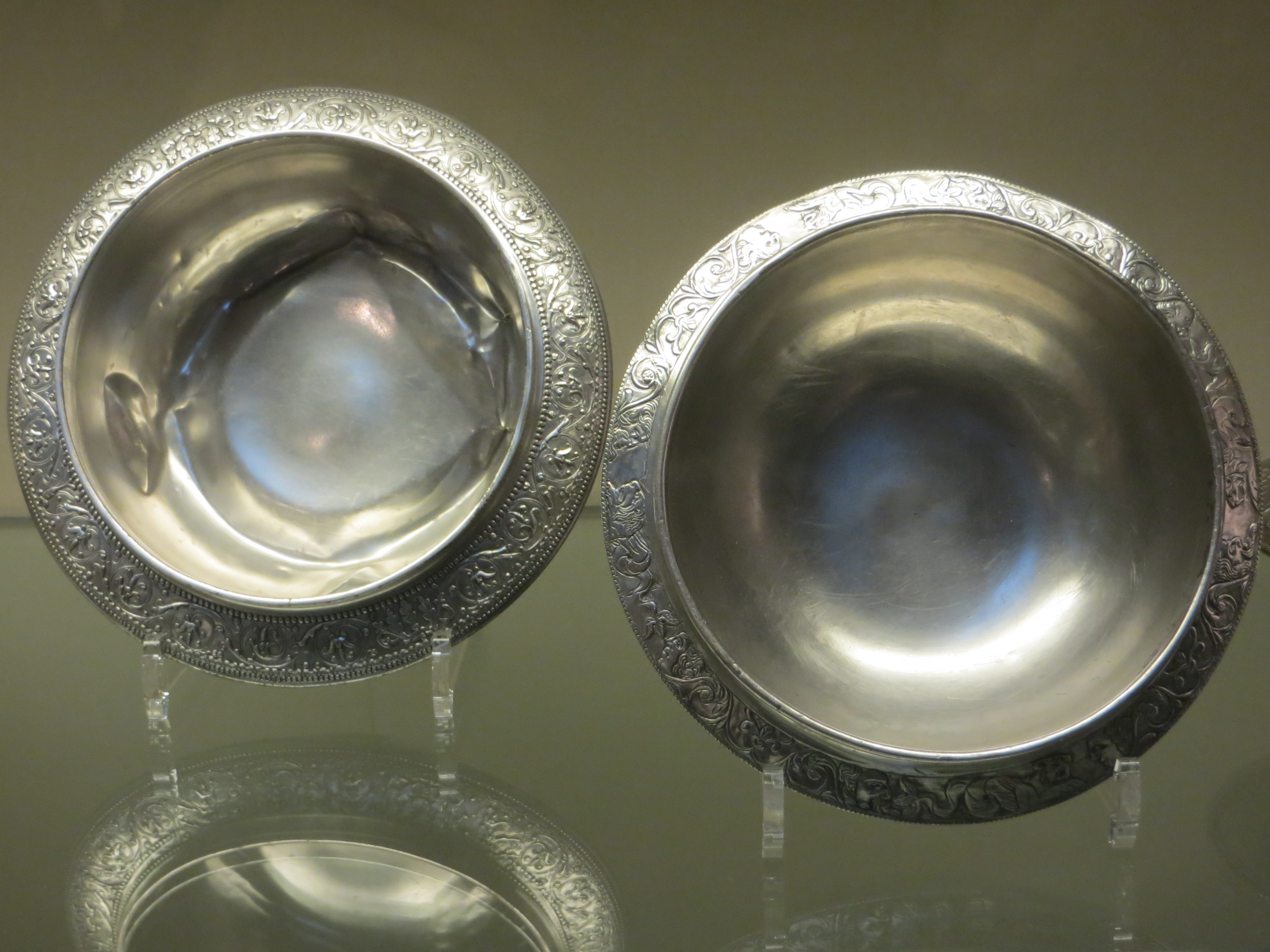
Two silver bowls with ornamented engraving

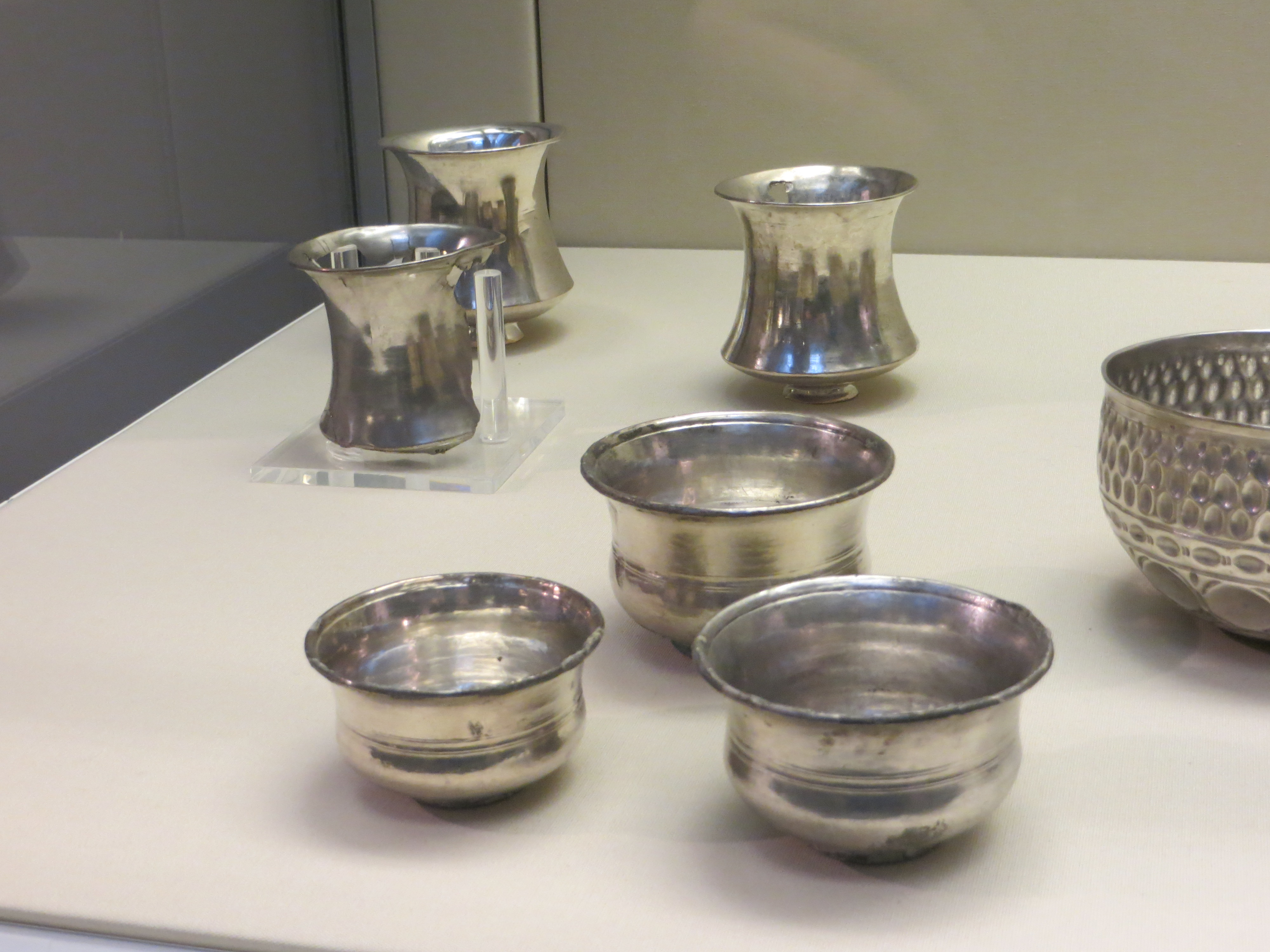
Various silver cups and bowls from the treasure

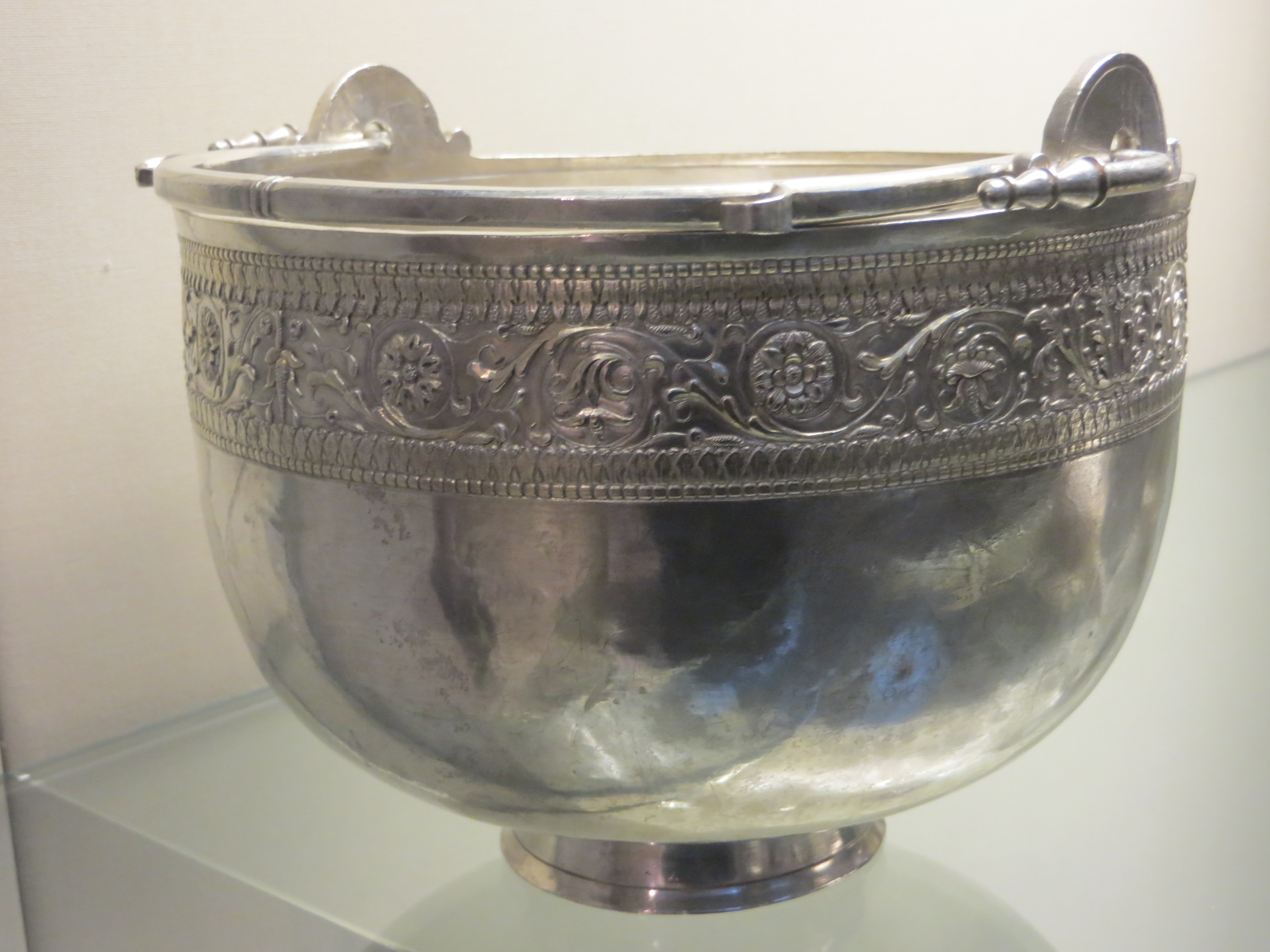
Silver handled bucket or situla

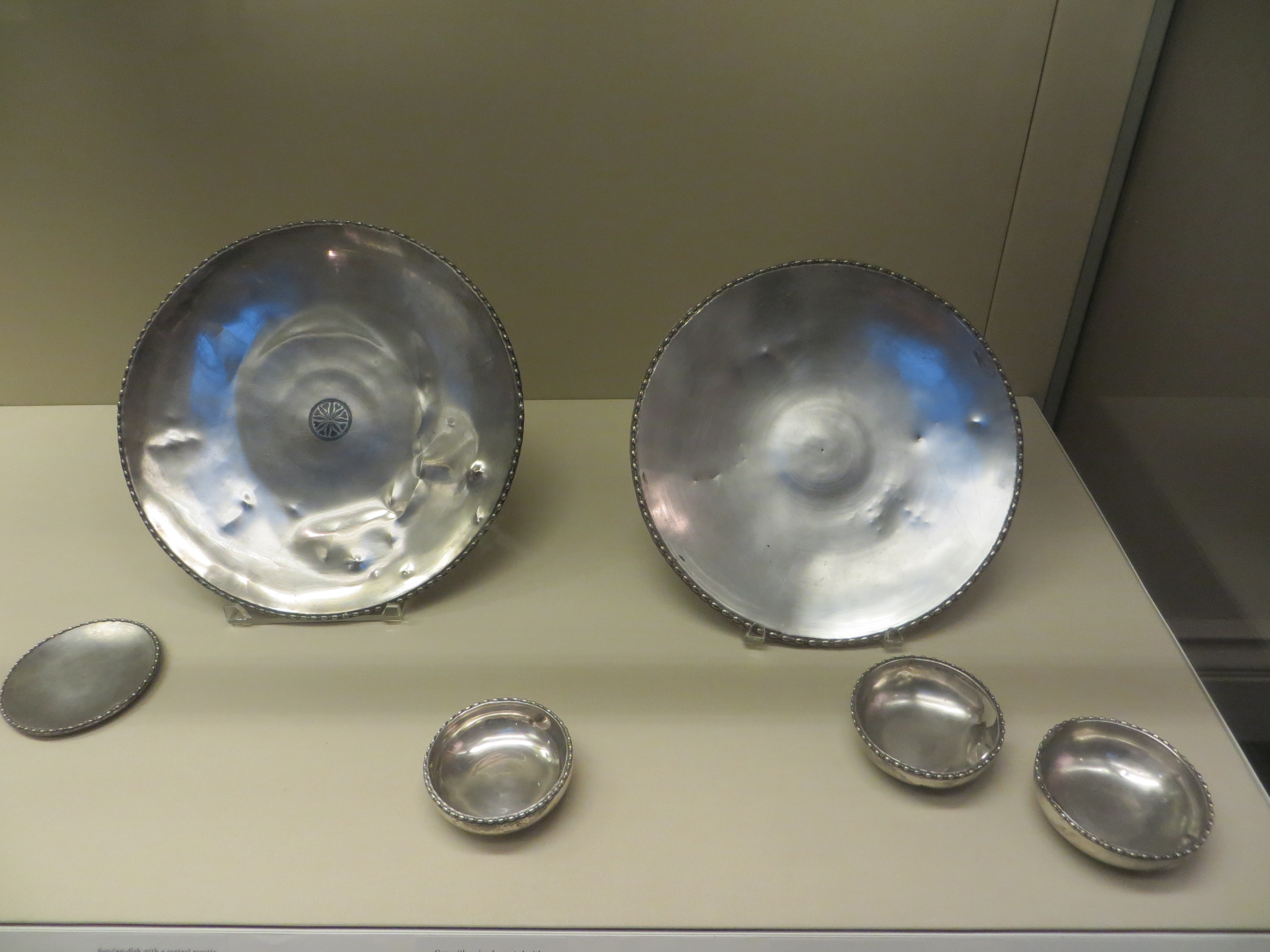
Two platters beside three bowls and a small plate

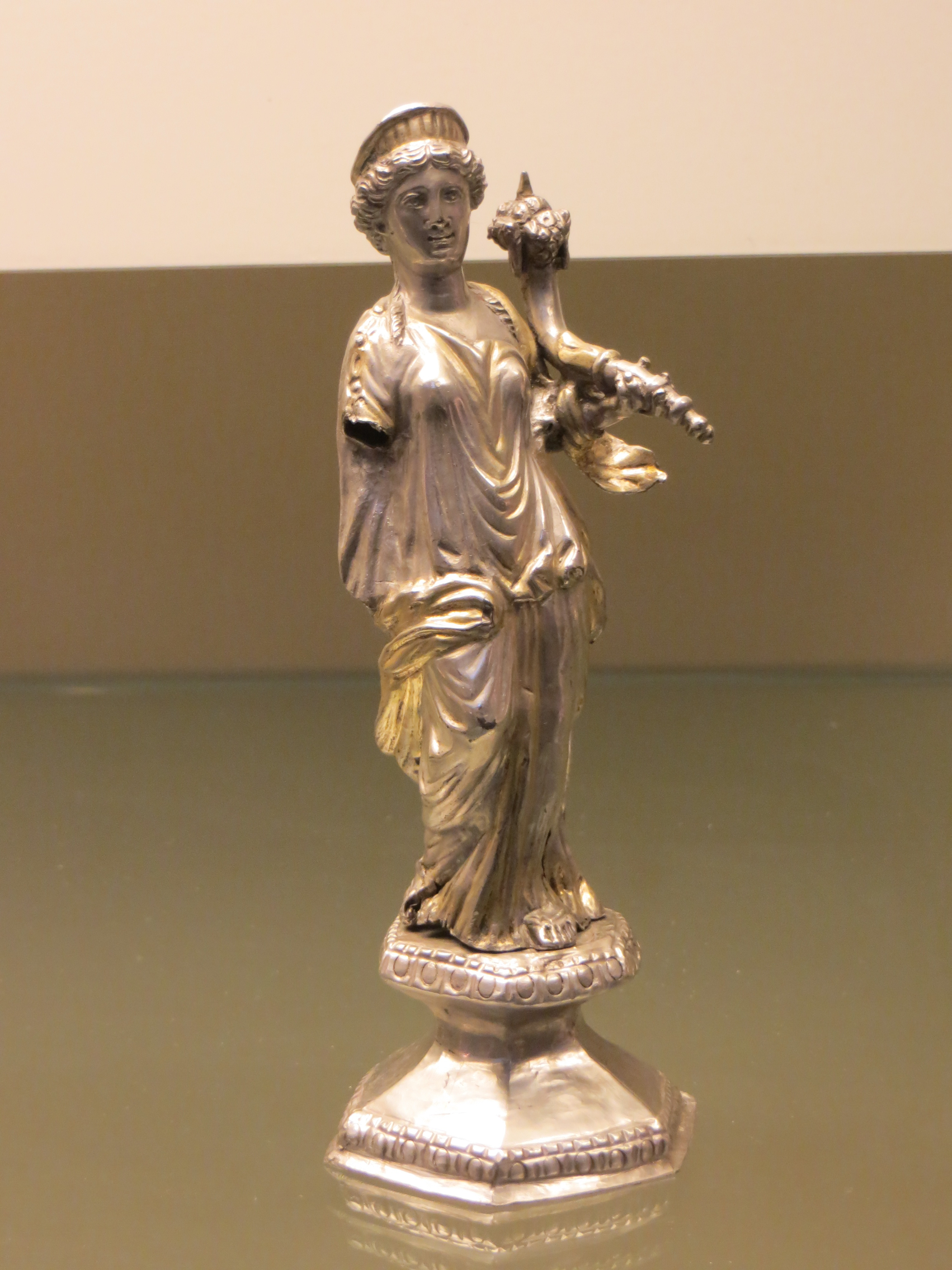
Silver-gilt figure of Fortuna

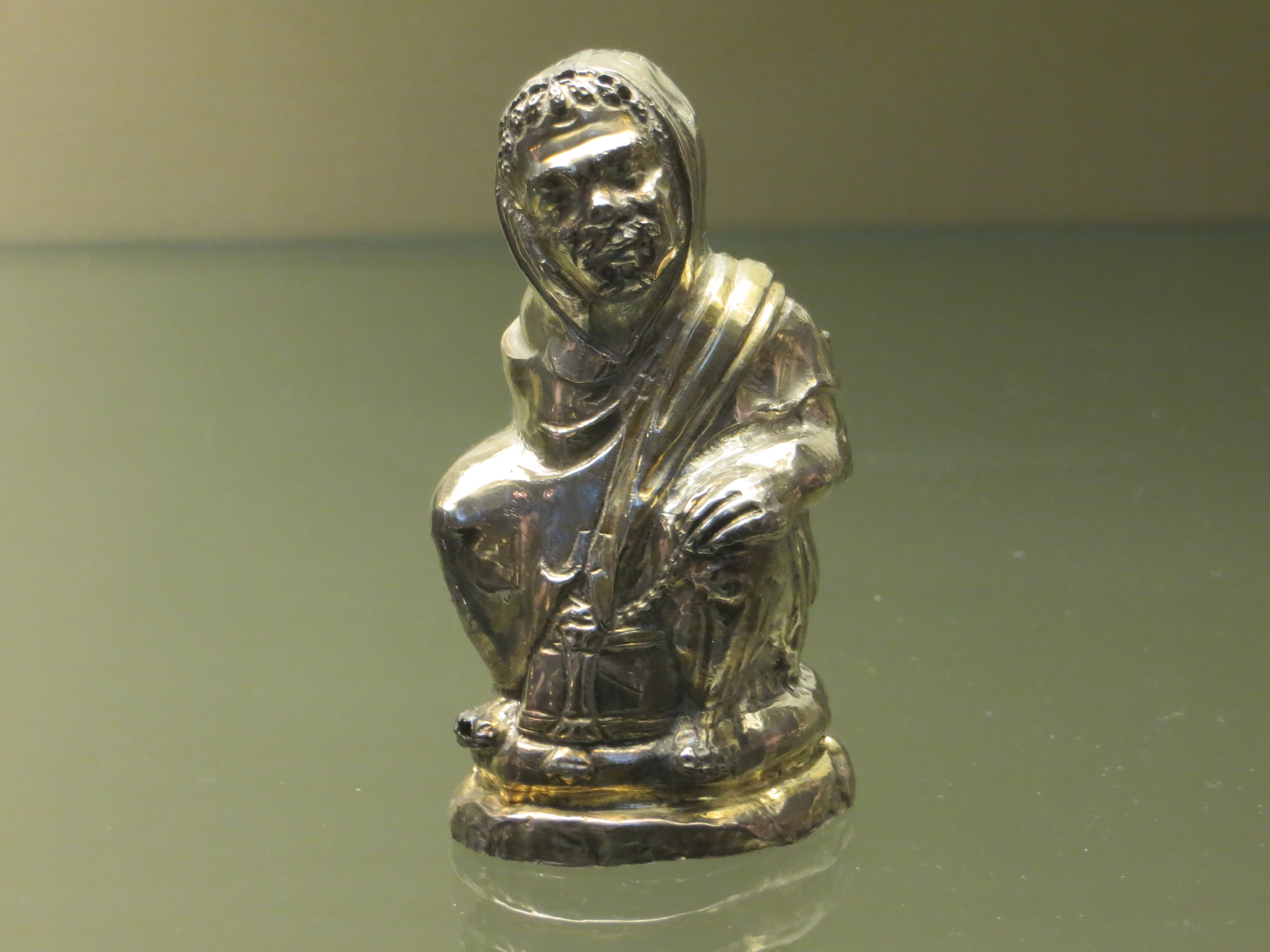
Pepper-pot of squatting slave

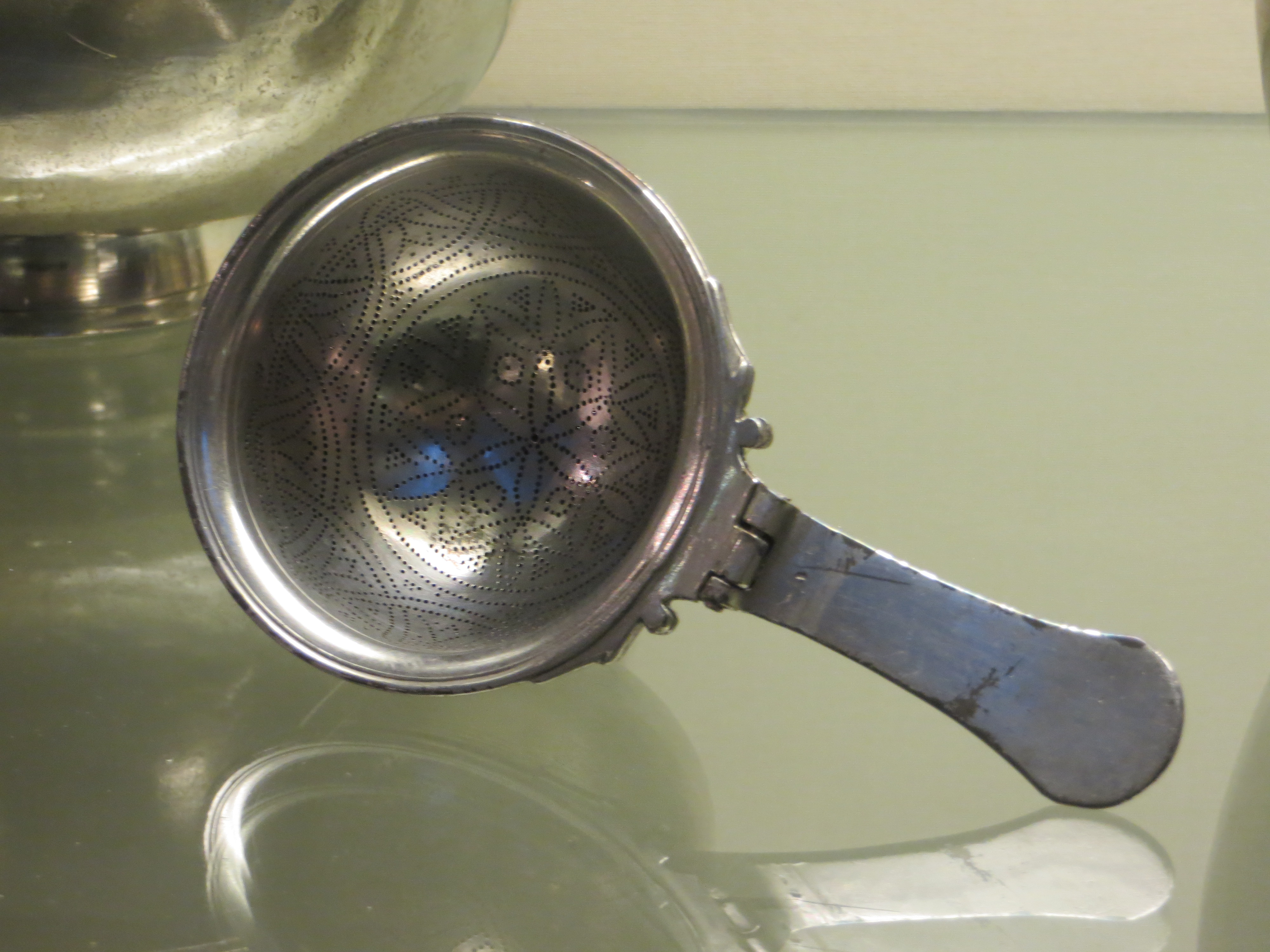
Strainer with geometric design

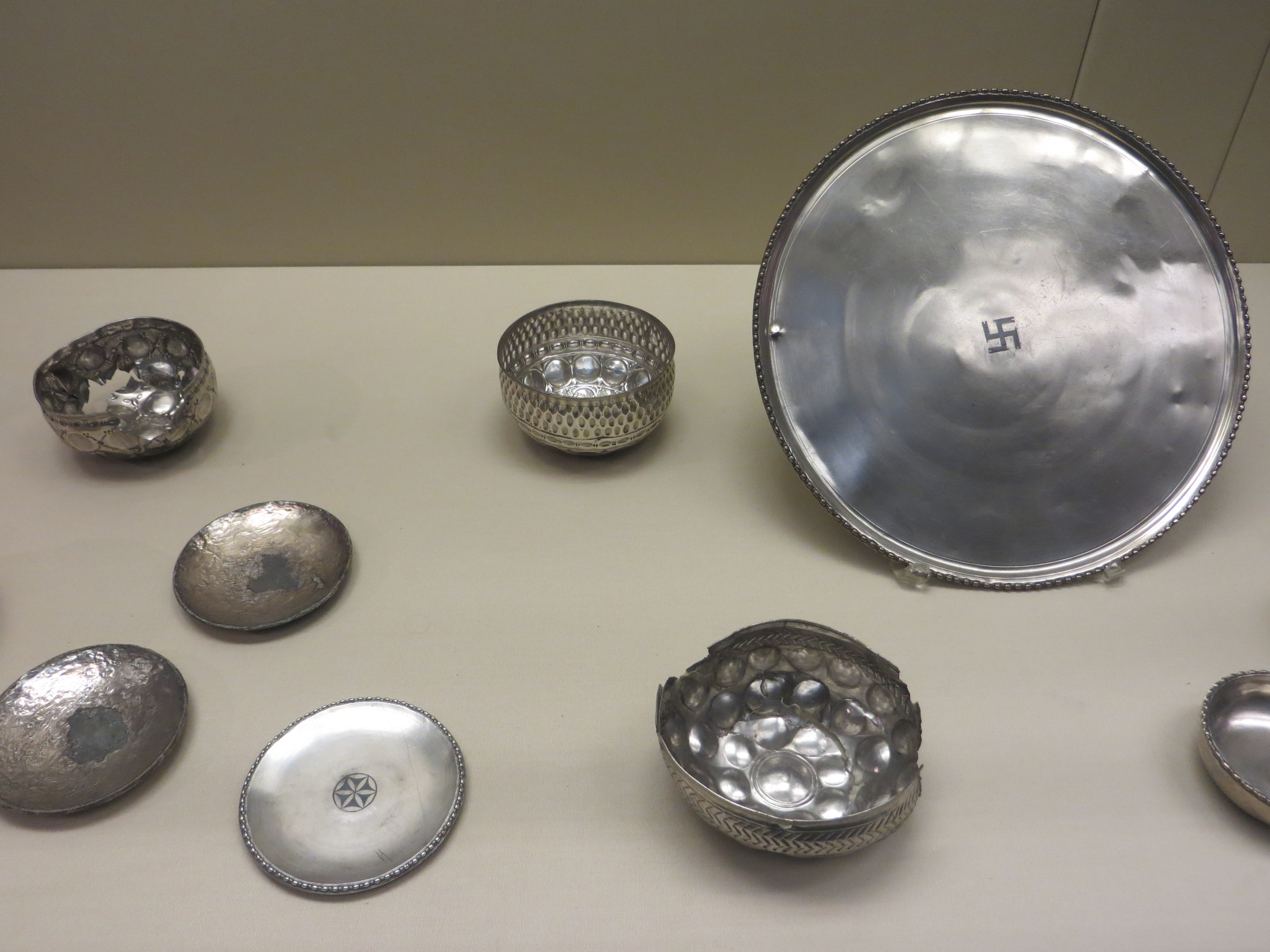
Platter with swastika in centre next to various bowls and plates

== Bibliography ==
- D. Strong, Greek and Roman Silver Plate (British Museum Press, 1966)
- L. Burn, The British Museum Book of Greek and Roman Art (British Museum Press, 1991)
- S. Walker, Roman Art (British Museum Press, 1991)
