= Mâcon Treasure =

Roman silver hoard

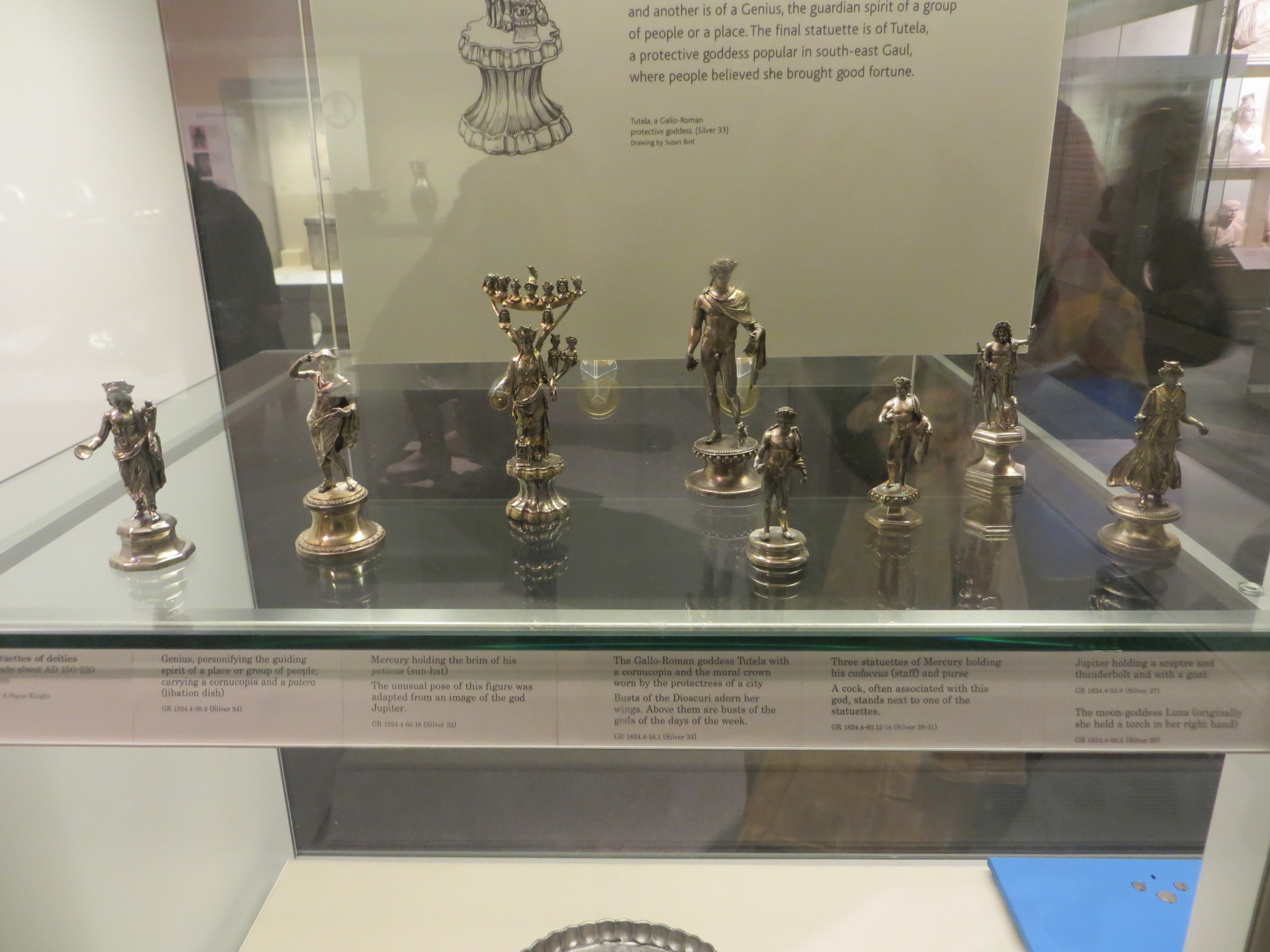
- Macon Treasure as displayed in the British Museum
- Material: Silver
- Created: 3rd century AD
- Discovered: Mâcon, France
- Present location: British Museum, London

The Mâcon Treasure or Macon Treasure is a Roman silver hoard found in the city of Mâcon, eastern France in 1764. Soon after its discovery, the bulk of the treasure disappeared, with only 8 silver statuettes and a silver plate identified as being part of the original find. All of these objects are now in the British Museum

== Discovery ==
In 1764, a large hoard of Roman silver was found in Mâcon, Burgundy. Early reports suggest that the treasure included over 30,000 gold and silver coins, a wide range of jewellery, five plates and a large number of silver figurines. Most of these objects disappeared, presumably to be melted down for the value of their bullion. Just eight statuettes and one silver plate remain from the original treasure. The statuettes were bequeathed by the museum trustee and philanthropist Richard Payne Knight, while the plate was acquired by the museum as part of the Duc de Blacas collection.

== Original purpose ==
The statuettes probably formed part of a public or domestic shrine or altar for local worship. A figure engraved in the central medallion of the dish shows a man pouring a libation at an altar. Based on the age of the latest coins found with the hoard (none of which date later than the Roman emperor Gallienus), archaeologists have estimated that the treasure originates from the second half of the 3rd century, when this part of Gaul was facing insurrection during the Crisis of the Third Century.

== Description ==
Four of the statuettes represent the Roman deity Mercury, who was widely worshipped in Roman Gaul. Other images of deities represented include the moon-goddess Luna, Genius and Jupiter, who is clasping a thunderbolt. Perhaps the most impressive item in the treasure is the small figure of a tutela, the goddess of chance or fortune. She is shown carrying in her hand a plate and busts of various divinities and between her wings are placed images of gods of the seven days of the week: Saturn, Sol, Luna, Mars, Mercury, Jupiter and Venus. The only other item associated with the treasure is a large circular dish made of silver.

== See also ==
- Chaourse Treasure
- Caubiac Treasure
- Chatuzange Treasure
- Berthouville Treasure
- Beaurains Treasure

== Gallery ==
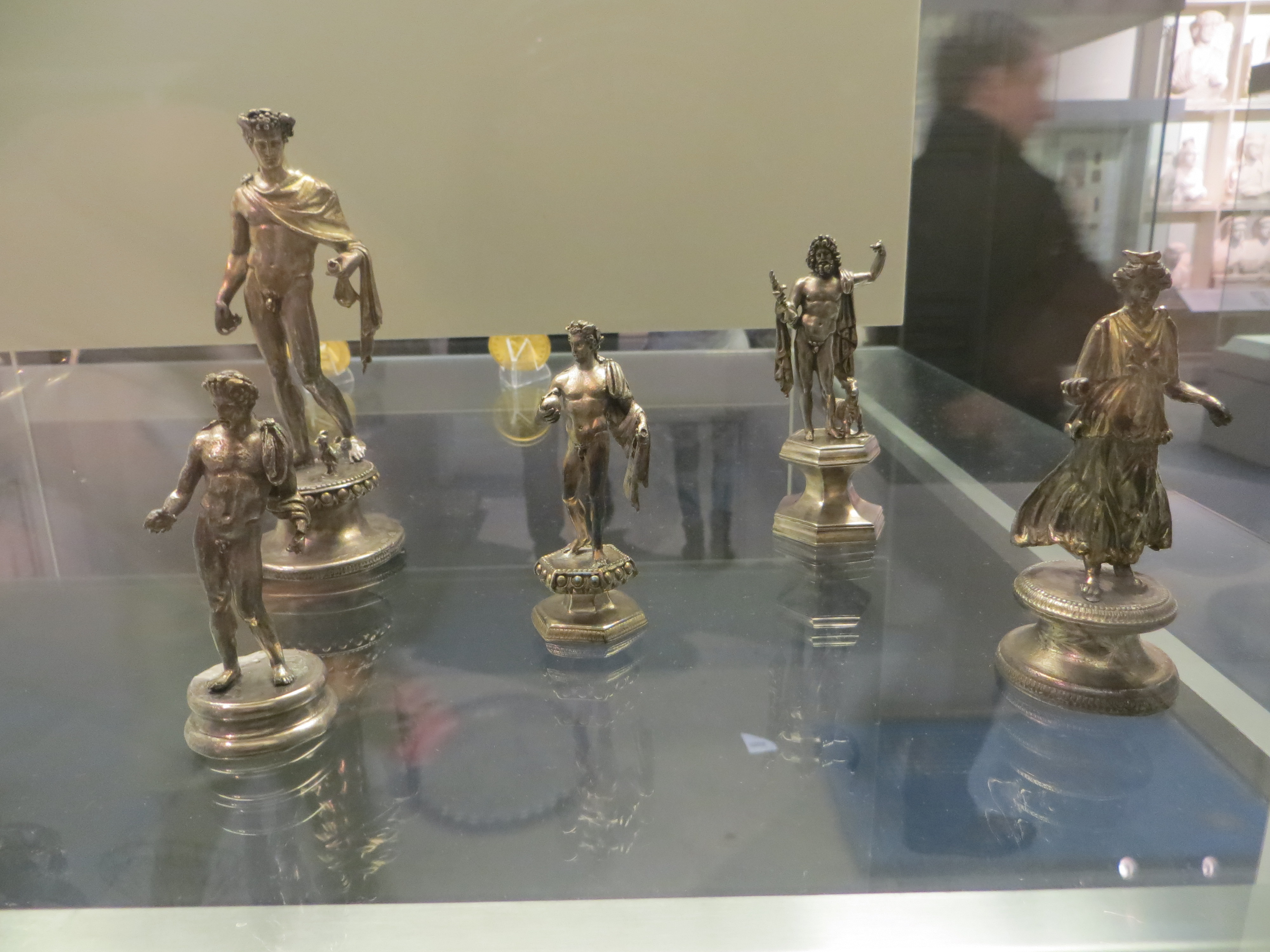
Three silver statuettes of Mercury next to Jupiter and Luna

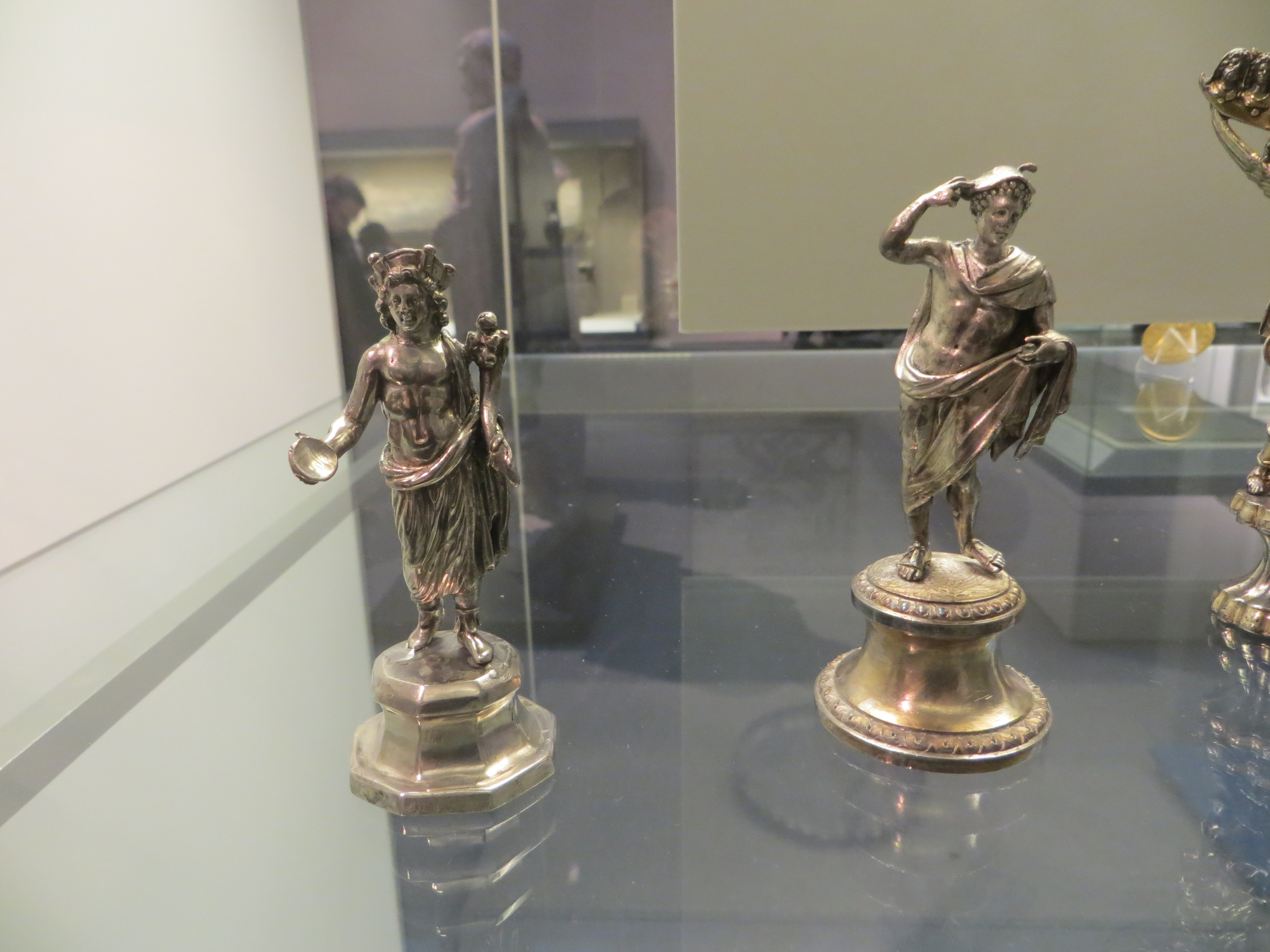
Representation of Genius and Mercury

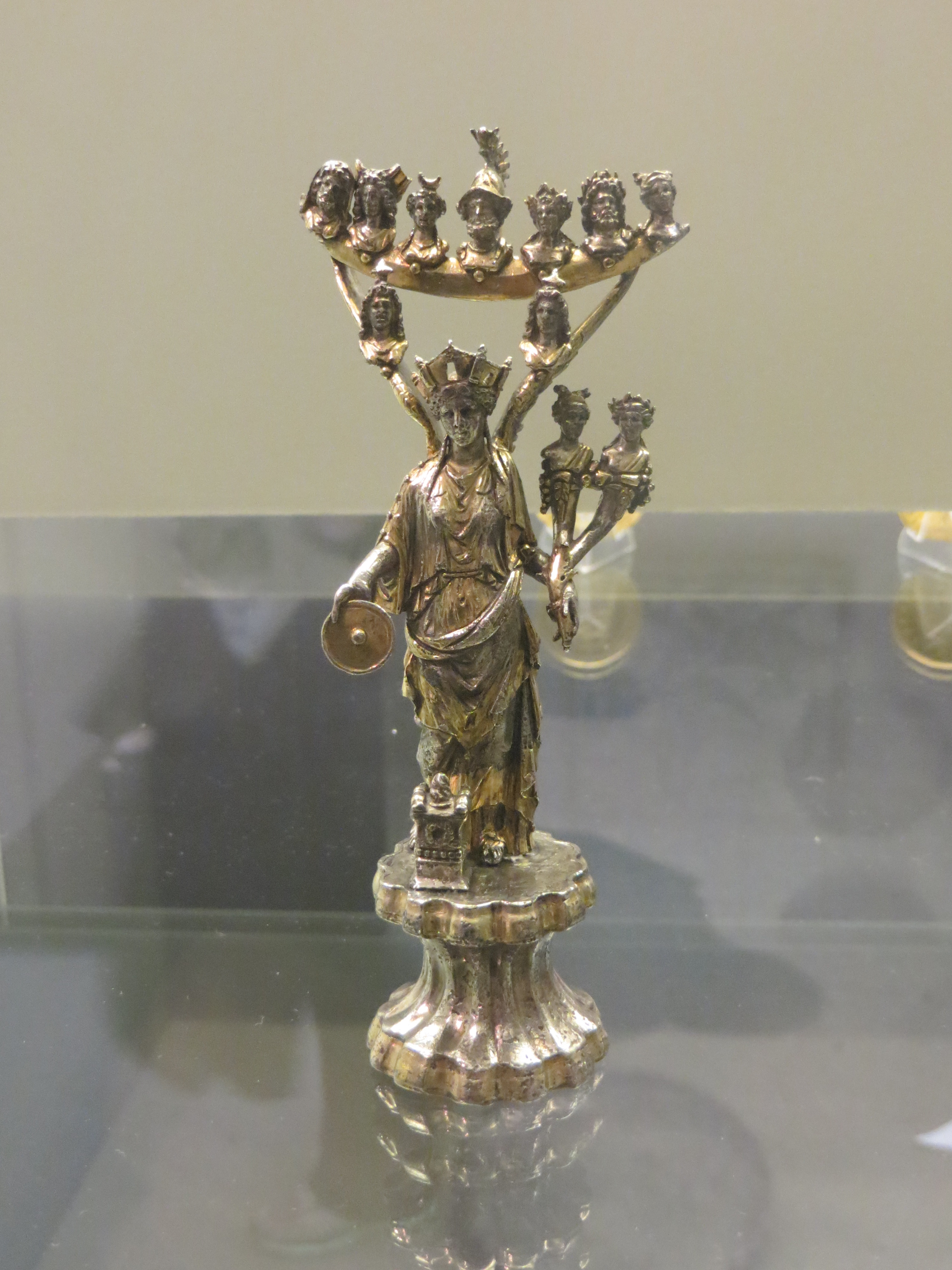
Tutela figurine with images of the seven days of the week - 14 cm high

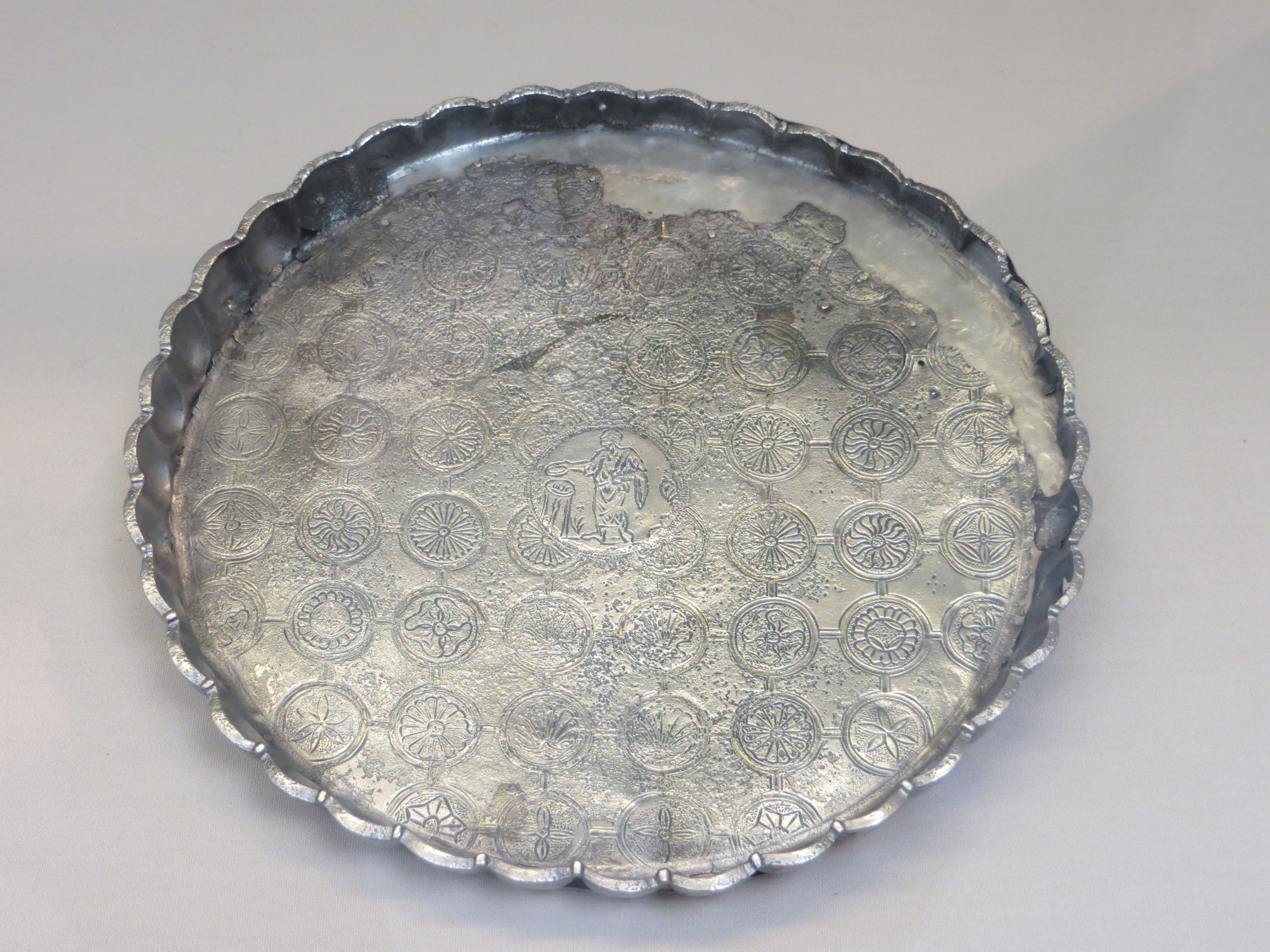
Silver dish with fluted rim. In the central medallion, a man pours a libation at a shrine

== Bibliography ==
- D. Strong, Greek and Roman Silver Plate (British Museum Press, 1966)
- L. Burn, The British Museum Book of Greek and Roman Art (British Museum Press, 1991)
- S. Walker, Roman Art (British Museum Press, 1991)
