= Chatuzange Treasure =

Roman hoard

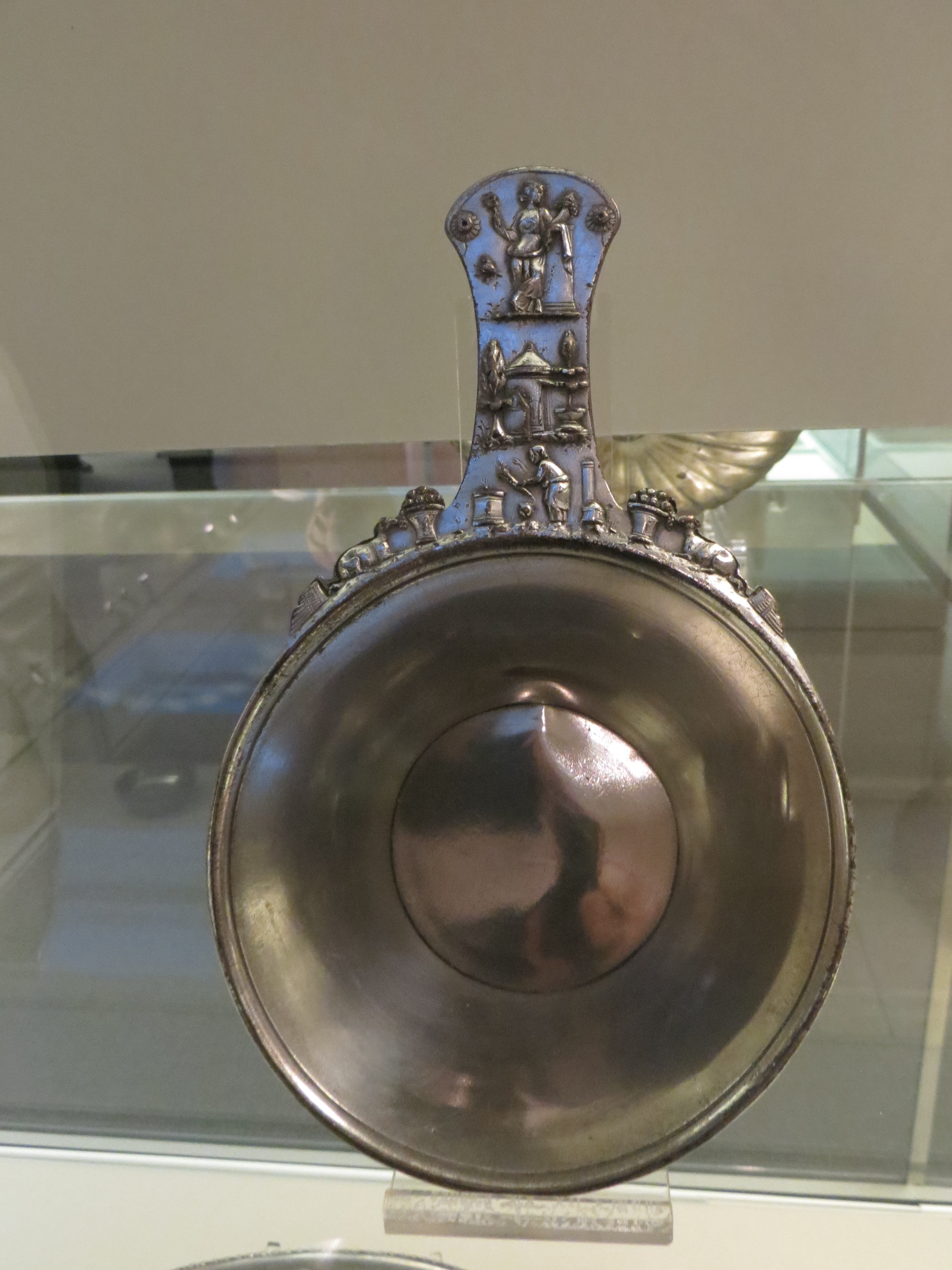
- Skillet or saucepan with the figure of Felicitas from the Chatuzange Treasure, as displayed in the British Museum
- Material: Silver
- Size: Length 23.5 cm
- Created: 2nd-3rd Century AD
- Present location: British Museum, London

The Chatuzange Treasure is the name of an important Roman silver hoard found in the village of Chatuzange-le-Goubet in the department of Drôme, south-eastern France. Since 1893 it has been part of the British Museum's collection.

== Discovery ==
In the district of La Part-Dieu near Chatuzange-le-Goubet, among the ruins of a large Roman villa, a significant silver hoard was unearthed in 1888. The treasure, which consists of six pieces of antique dishes, seems to have been buried for safe-keeping, perhaps during the period of local insurrections that occurred at this time in Roman Gaul. It was discovered by the land-owner of the site who subsequently sold the treasure to a Paris art dealer, who in turn sold it to the British Museum in London.

== Description ==
The whole treasure is composed of six pieces of high quality Roman silver that dates from the 2nd and 3rd centuries AD and has a total weight of 5.6 kilograms (12 lb). There are two skillets, one of which is decorated with the figure of Felicitas between two rosettes and below her a woman offering a sacrifice at an altar, while the other is adorned with the necks of swans and a basket of fruit. Other items in the treasure include a large fluted washing-bowl with the figures of the Three Graces in the central panel, another fluted dish, a large plate and a small cup, both with a niello inlaid swastika, which was a relatively common symbol in the Roman Empire.

== See also ==
Other Roman silverware treasure :

- Chaourse Treasure
- Mâcon Treasure
- Caubiac Treasure
- Berthouville Treasure
- Boscoreale Treasure
- Rethel Treasure

== Gallery ==
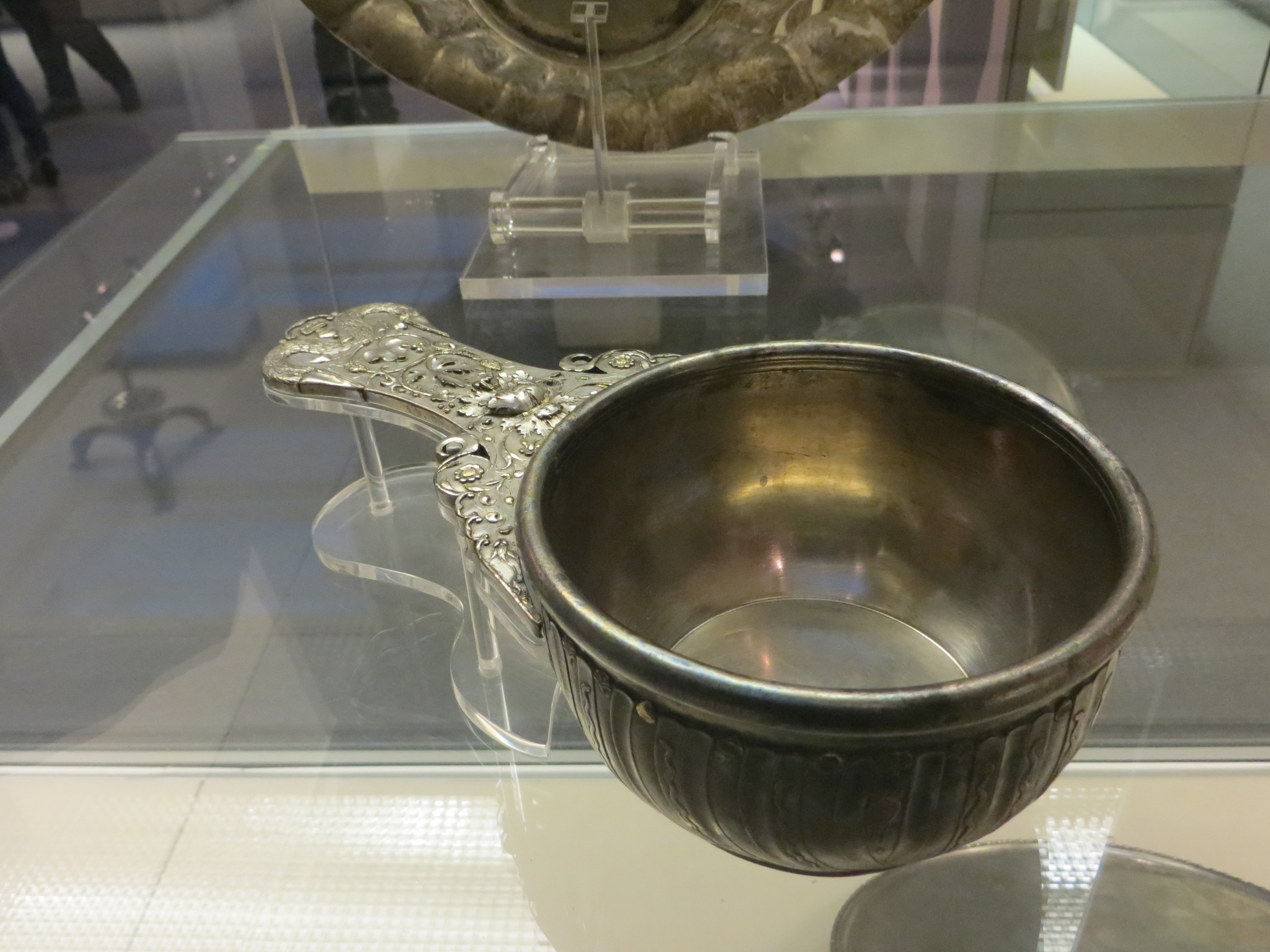
Another silver saucepan from the treasure

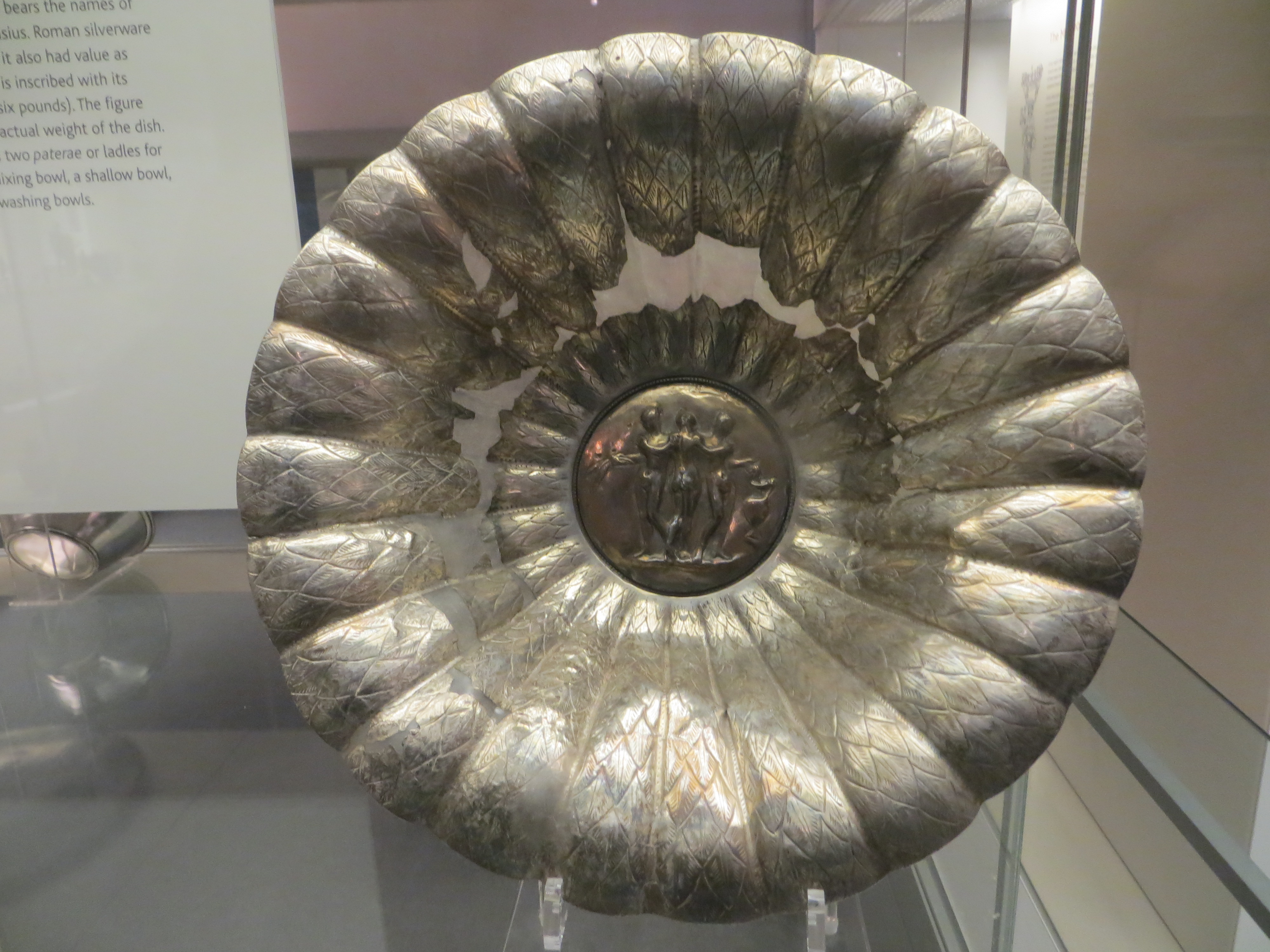
Fluted bowl with the three graces

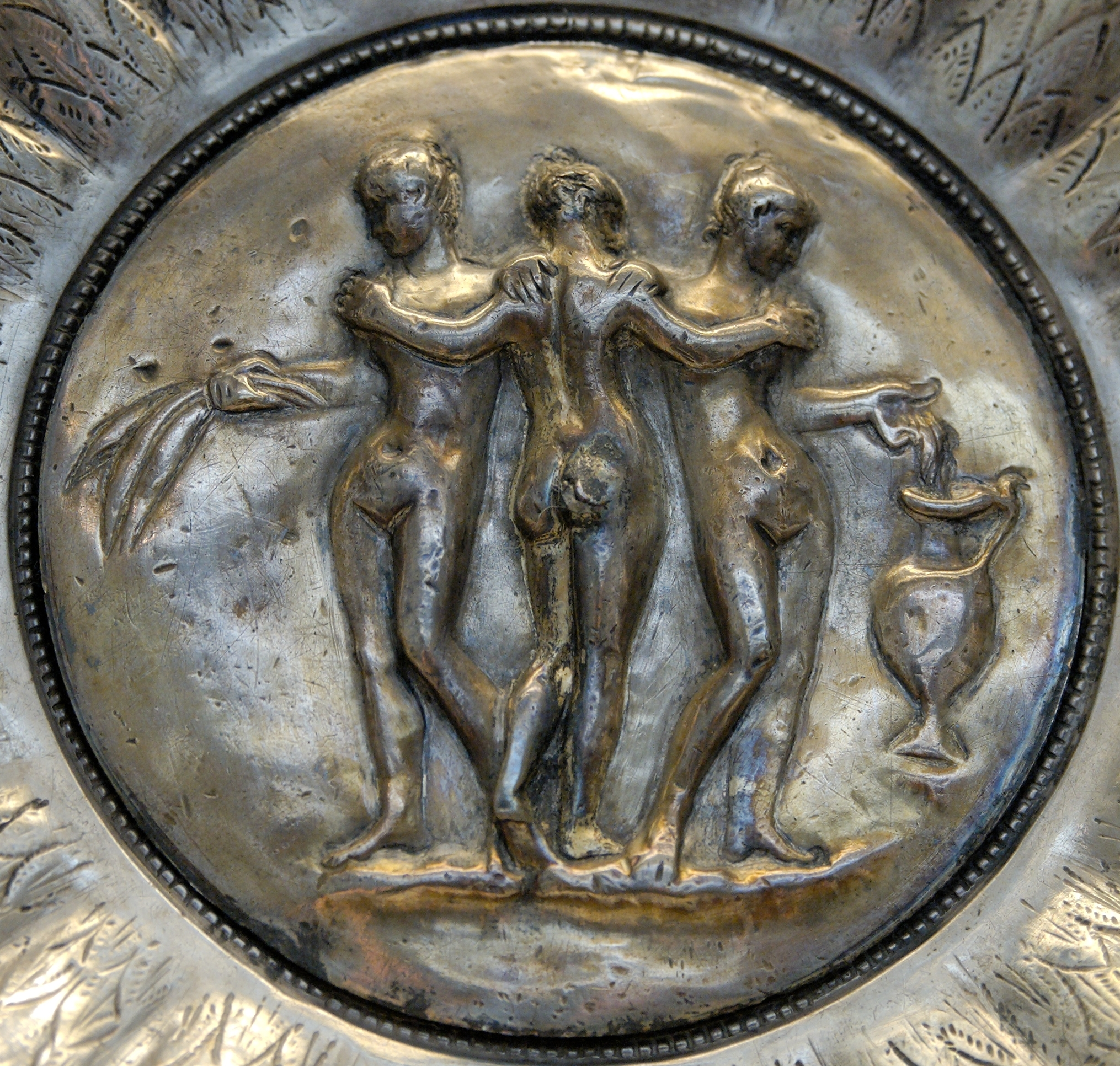
Detail of the three graces on the bowl

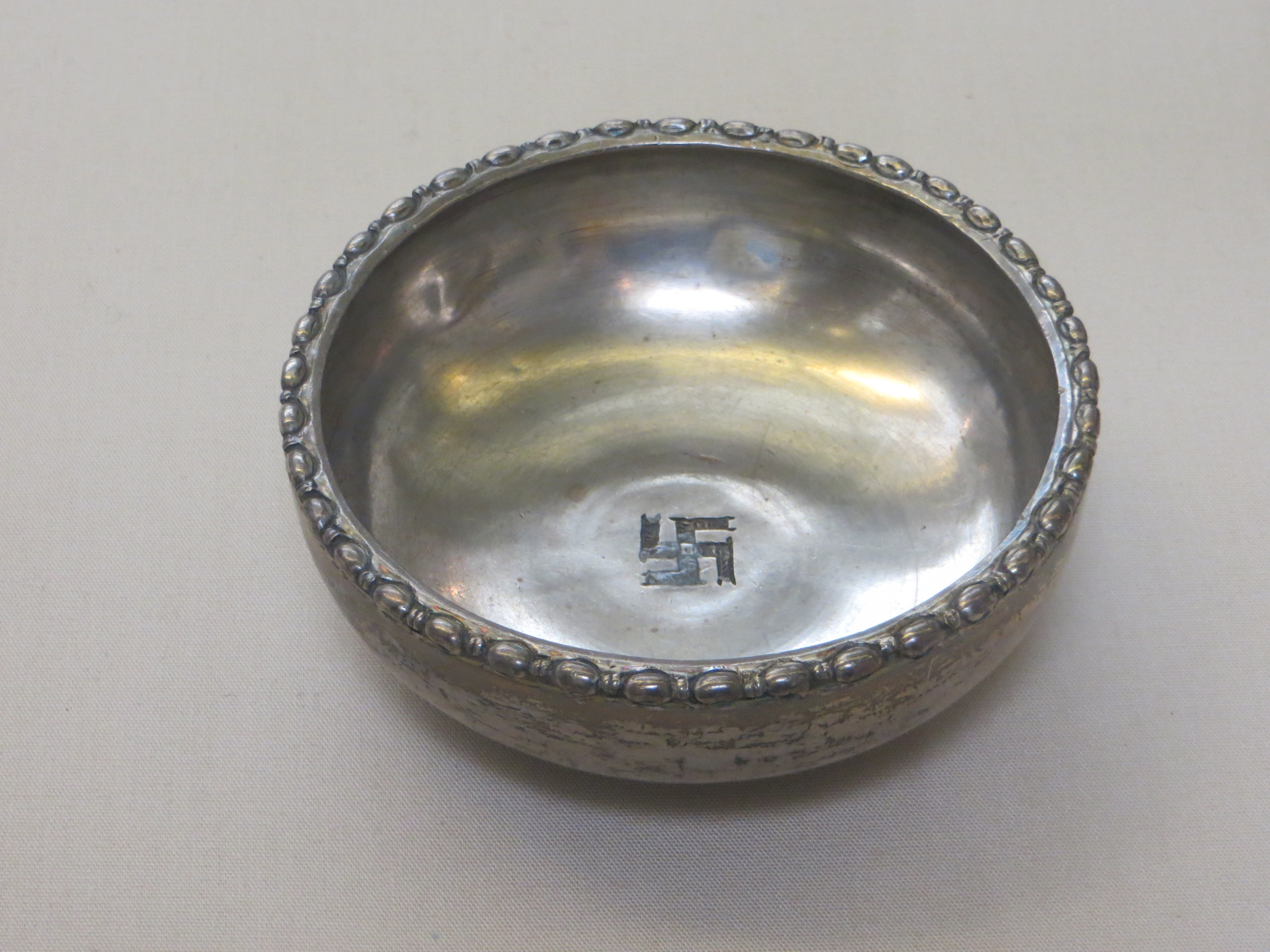
Cup decorated with a central swastika

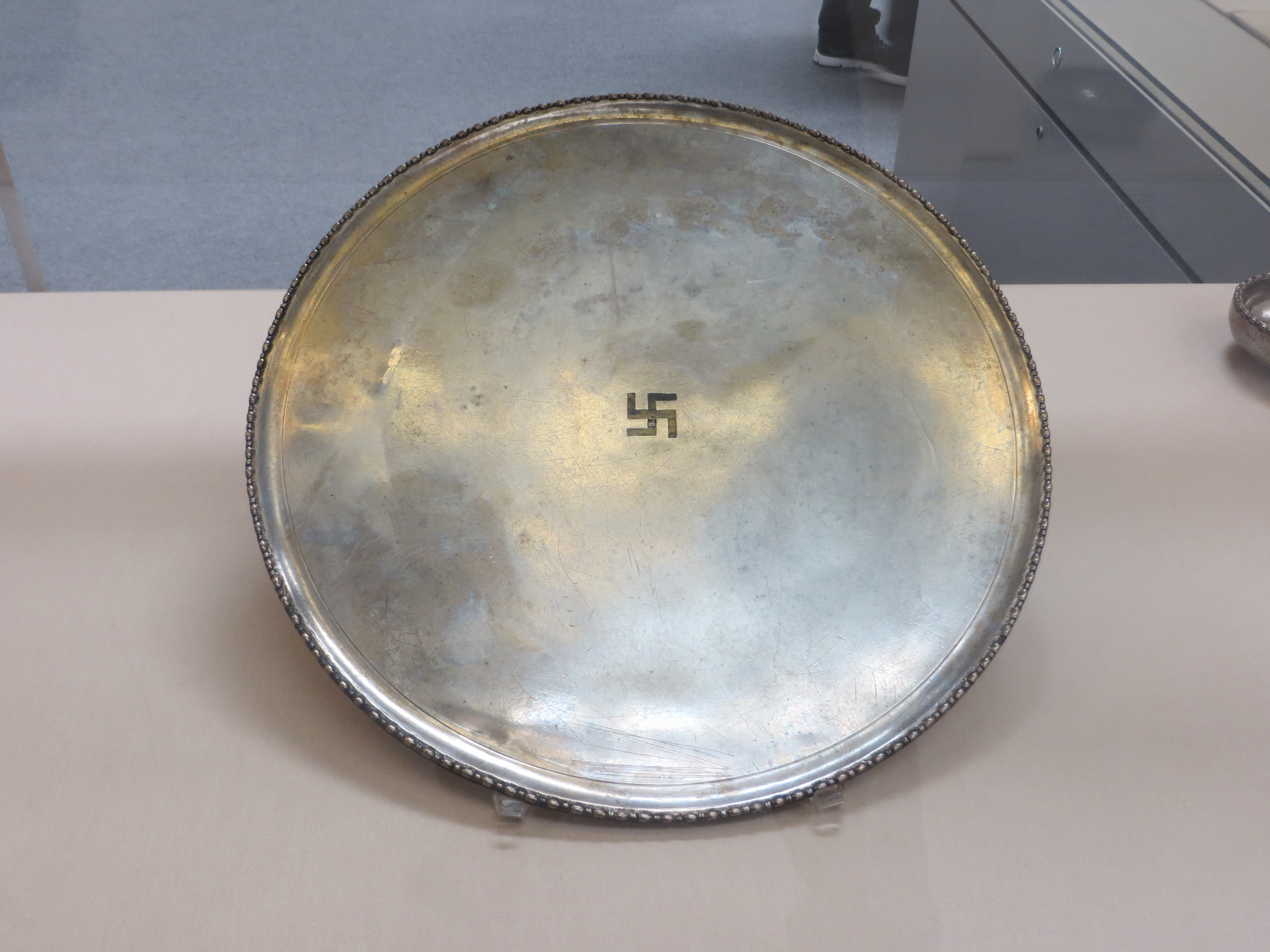
Serving dish decorated with swastika engraved in niello

== Bibliography ==
- D. Strong, Greek and Roman Silver Plate (British Museum Press, 1966)
- L. Burn, The British Museum Book of Greek and Roman Art (British Museum Press, 1991)
- S. Walker, Roman Art (British Museum Press, 1991)
- Archaeological Society of Drôme (Vol. XXII. Page 340-345).
- K. Painter, Le Tresor de Chatuzange in 'Tresors d'orfevrrerie gallo-romaine' (F. Baratte (ed)), 1989, Paris
