= Thil, Haute-Garonne =

Thil
- Commune
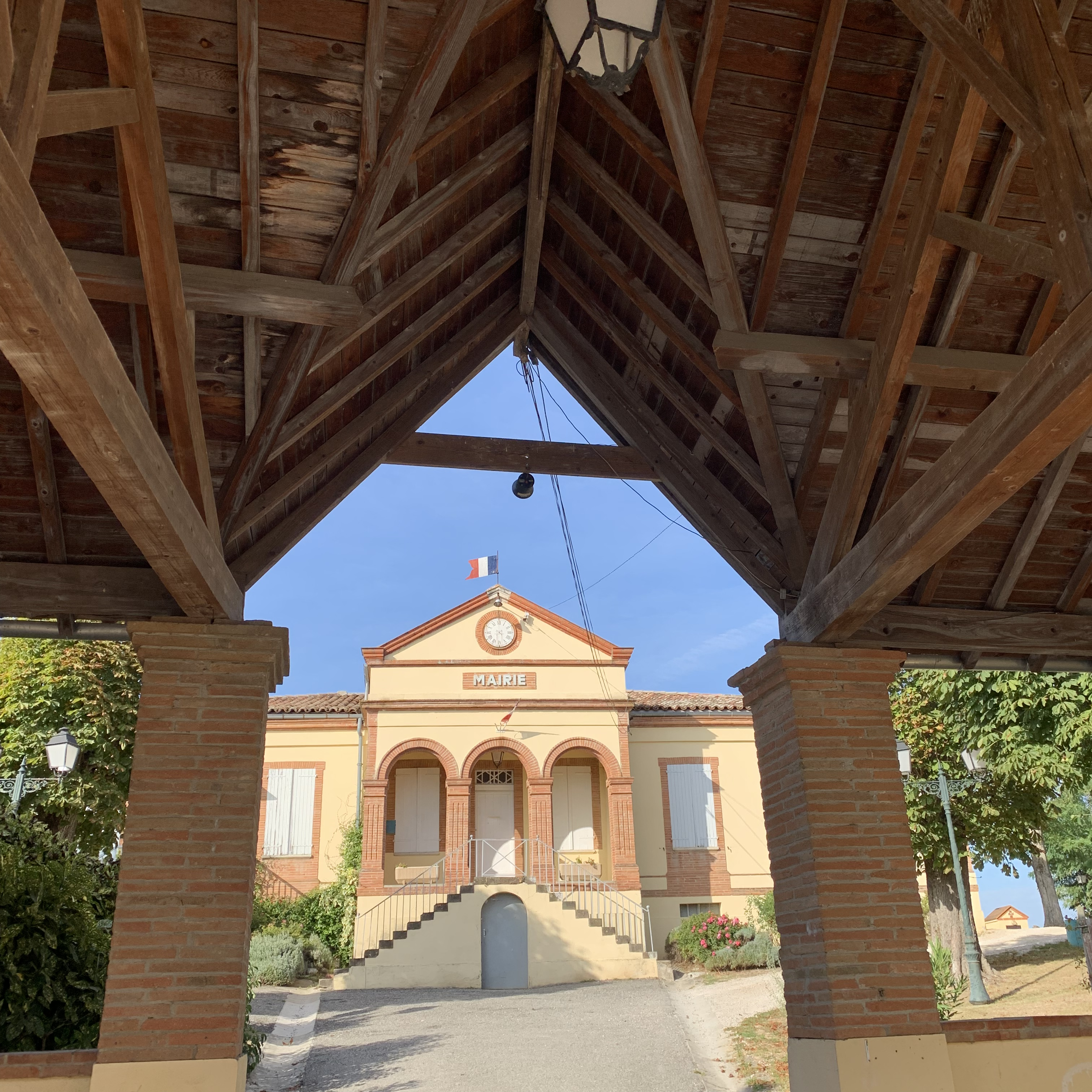
- Town hall

- Coat of arms
- Location of Thil
- Location within France Location within Occitanie
- Coordinates: 43°42′47″N 1°09′41″E
- Country: France
- Region: Occitania
- Department: Haute-Garonne
- Arrondissement: Toulouse
- Canton: Léguevin
- Intercommunality: Hauts Tolosans

Government
  - Mayor (2020–2026): Céline Frayard
- Area^{1}: 23.68 km^{2} (9.14 sq mi)
- Elevation: 215 m (705 ft)
- Highest elevation: 275 m (902 ft)
- Lowest elevation: 149 m (489 ft)
- Population (2023): 1,136
  - Density: 47.97/km^{2} (124.2/sq mi)
- Time zone: UTC+01:00 (CET)
  - Summer (DST): UTC+02:00 (CEST)
- INSEE/Postal code: 31553 /31530
- ^{1} French Land Register data, which excludes lakes, ponds, glaciers > 1 km^{2} (0.386 sq mi or 247 acres) and river estuaries.

Thil (French pronunciation: [til]; Occitan: Tilh) is a commune in the Haute-Garonne department in southwestern France.

== Population ==
Historical population
Year	Pop.	±% p.a.
1968	441	—
1975	425	−0.53%
1982	563	+4.10%
1990	735	+3.39%
1999	831	+1.37%
2007	1,021	+2.61%
2012	1,155	+2.50%
2017	1,176	+0.36%
2023	1,136	−0.58%
Source: INSEE

== See also ==
- Communes of the Haute-Garonne department
