= Silvia =

Silvia (Italian: [ˈsilvja]) is a female given name of Latin origin, with a male equivalent Silvio and English-language cognate Sylvia. The name originates from the Latin word for forest, Silva, and its meaning is "spirit of the wood"; the mythological god of the forest was associated with the figure of Silvanus. Silvia is also a surname.

In Roman mythology, Silvia is the goddess of the forest, while Rhea Silvia was the mother of Romulus and Remus. Silvia is also the name of one of the female innamorati of the commedia dell'arte and is a character of the Aminta written by Torquato Tasso.

== People with the given name ==
- Queen Silvia of Sweden (born 1943), German-born spouse of King Carl XVI Gustaf
- Saint Silvia, Italian saint of the 6th century
- Silvia Abascal (born 1979), Spanish actress
- Silvia Abril (born 1971), Spanish actress and comedian
- Silvia Agüero (born 1985), Spanish Roma writer and activist
- Silvia Airik-Priuhka (1926–2014), Estonian writer and poetry translator
- Silvia Albano, Italian judge
- Silvia Alonso (born 1989), Spanish actress
- Silvia Ambrosio (born 1997), Italian tennis player
- Silvia Araya (1930–2021), Chilean-born Canadian painter and art instructor
- Silvia Arber (born 1968), Swiss neurobiologist
- Silvia Arrom (born 1949), American historian
- Silvia Bächli (born 1956), Swiss visual artist
- Silvia Balletti (1701–1758), Italian actress
- Silvia Baraldino (born 1947), Italian political activist
- Silvia Barbescu (born 1961), Romanian painter
- Silvia Bellot, Spanish motor racing official
- Silvia Blair, Colombian scientist
- Silvia Bovenschen (1946–2017), German feminist literary critic, author, and essayist
- Silvia Braslavsky (born 1942), Argentinian chemist
- Silvia Breher (born 1973), German politician
- Silvia Calzón (born 1975), Spanish epidemiologist and politician
- Silvia Cambir (1924–2007), Romanian painter
- Silvia Cartwright (born 1943), New Zealand Viceroy, jurist
- Silvia Cavalleri (born 1972), Italian professional golfer
- Silvia Cesana (born 1999), know professionally as Sissi, Italian singer-songwriter
- Silvia Ciornei (born 1970), Romanian politician
- Silvia Clemente (born 1967), Spanish politician and civil servant
- Silvia Carreño-Coll (born 1963), Dominican-American judge
- Silvia Collatina (born 1972), Italian actress
- Silvia Colloca (born 1977), Italian-Australian actress, singer, and cookbook author
- Silvia Contreras (born 1993), Mexican flag football player
- Silvia Corzo (born 1973), Colombian lawyer and news presenter
- Silvia D'Amico (born 1986), Italian actress
- Silvia de Grasse (1921–1978), Panamanian jazz and tamborera singer
- Silvia Derbez (1932–2002), Mexican actress
- Silvia Dionisio (born 1950), Italian actress
- Silvia Disderi (born 1983), Italian professional tennis player
- Silvia Dominguez (born 1987), Spanish basketball player
- Silvia Eiblmayr, Austrian art historian and curator
- Silvia Ferrari, Italian-American aerospace engineer
- Silvia Filippini-Fantoni (born 1974), Italian US-based museum director
- Silvia Fontana (born 1976), Italian figure skater
- Silvia Foti (born 1961), American journalist
- Silvia Fominaya (born 1975), Spanish model, actress, and presenter
- Silvia Fuselli, Italian footballer
- Silvia Gosewinkel (born 1986), German politician
- Silvia Heubach, German-American mathematician
- Silvia Hroncová (born 1964), Slovak manager and publisher
- Silvia Hunte (born 1938), Panamanian sprinter
- Silvia Intxaurrondo (born 1979), Spanish journalist
- Silvia Laidla (1927–2012), Estonian actress
- Silvia Lara Povedano (born 1959), Costa Rican politician and sociologist
- Silvia Levenson (born 1957), Argentine artist and activist
- Silvia Lospennato (born 1977), Argentine political scientist and politician
- Silvia Lulcheva (born 1969), Bulgarian actress
- Sílvia Pérez Cruz (born 1983), Spanish singer
- Silvia Puppo Gastélum (born 1956), Mexican politician
- Silvia Madetzky (born 1962), German female discus thrower
- Silvia Marcovici (born 1952), Romanian violinist
- Silvia Marin (born 1967), Italian-born flamenco dancer
- Silvia Mezzanotte (born 1967), Italian singer
- Silvia Monti (1946–2026), Italian actress
- Silvia Moreno-Garcia (born 1981), Mexican-Canadian writer
- Silvia Sorina Munteanu, Romanian singer
- Silvia Navarro (born 1978), Mexican actress
- Silvia Neid (born 1964), German professional football player and manager
- Silvia Njirić (born 1993), Croatian tennis player
- Silvia Obrist, Swiss wheelchair curler
- Silvia Odio (born 1937), Cuban-American who testified at the Warren Commission investigation
- Silva Oja (born 1961), Estonian heptathlete
- Silvia Olari (born 1988), Italian singer
- Silvia Olmedo (born 1976), Spanish psychologist, sexologist, television host, producer, and author
- Silvia Paladino (born 1971), Australian singer
- Silvia Peppoloni, Italian geologist, researcher, and scholar
- Silvia Picozzi, Italian physicist
- Silvia Pinal (1931–2024), Mexican actress
- Silvia Prada (born 1969), Spanish artist
- Silvia Radu (sculptor), Romanian sculptor
- Silvia Reyes (1949–2024), Spanish transgender activist
- Silvia Rivas (born 1957), Argentine artist
- Silvia Rodgers (1928–2006), German-Jewish-British writer and political activist
- Silvia Ruegger (1961–2019), Canadian long-distance runner
- Silvia Saint (born 1976), Czech pornographic actress
- Silvia Santelices (born 1940), Chilean actress
- Silvia Sapag (born 1949), Argentine politician
- Silvia Saunders (born 1990), English writer
- Silvia Schön (born 1959), German politician
- Silvia Semenzin (born 1991), Italian author, scholar, and activist
- Silvia Semeraro (born 1996), Italian karateka
- Silvia Seidel (1969–2012), German actress
- Silvia Solar (1936–2011), French actress
- Silvia Soler (born 1961), Spanish writer and journalist
- Silvia Sommer (born 1944), Austrian composer, pianist, and music producer
- Silvia Stroescu (born 1985), Romanian gymnast
- Silvia Stump (born 1953), Swiss alpine skier
- Silvia Tcherassi (born 1965), Colombian fashion designer
- Silvia Adriana Țicău (born 1970), Romanian politician
- Silvia Toffanin (born 1979), Italian television presenter and former model
- Silvia Torras (1936–1970), Argentine artist
- Silvia Tortora (1962–2022), Italian journalist
- Silvia Truu (1922–1990), Estonian children's writer
- Silvia Urbina (1928–2016), Chilean singer, folklorist, and teacher
- Silvia Vasquez-Lavado (born 1974), Peruvian-American explorer and mountaineer
- Silvia Valdés (born 1953), Guatemalan Supreme Court judge
- Silvia Valsecchi (born 1982), Italian racing cyclist
- Silvia Vignolini (born 1981), Italian physicist
- Silvia Vidal (born 1970), Spanish mountain climber
- Silvia Weissteiner (born 1979), Italian long-distance runner
- Silvia Yustos (born 1971), Spanish rhythmic gymnast and coach
- Silvia Zarzu (born 1998), Romanian artistic gymnast
- Silvia Zenari (1895–1956), Italian geologist and botanist
- Silvia Ziche (born 1967), Italian comic book artist and writer

== People with the surname ==
- Alan Silvia, American politician from Massachusetts
- Evelyn Silvia (1948–2006), American mathematician
- Stephen Silvia, American academic
- Tatiana Silva, professional name of Tatiana Silva Braga Tavares (1985), Belgian model and beauty pageant winner

== See also ==
- Sylvia (given name)
