= Silvis (surname) =

Silvis is a surname. People with the surname include:

- Gerben Silvis (born 1976), Dutch water polo player
- Jason Silvis, American politician
- Jos Silvis (born 1953), Dutch law professor and judge
- Khristian Silvis, American politician
- Randall Silvis, American novelist

== See also ==
- Silvis
- Silvi
- Silas (name)
- Silva (name)
- Silvia (name)
