= Sylvie =

Sylvie may refer to:

- Sylvie (novel), an 1853 novel by Gérard de Nerval
- Sylvie (actress) (1883–1970), French actress
- Sylvie (band), a Canadian rock band from Regina, active in the 2000s
- Sylvie (album), a 1962 album by Sylvie Vartan
- "Sylvie" (song), a 1998 song by Saint Etienne

== People with the given name ==
- Sylvie Andrich-Duval (born 1958), Luxembourgish politician
- Sylvie Andrieux (born 1961), French politician
- Sylvie Bérubé, Canadian politician
- Sylvie Bonnet (born 1969), French politician
- Sylvie Bouchet Bellecourt (born 1957), French politician
- Sylvie Covey (born 1954) French-born American visual artist, author
- Sylvie D'Amours (born 1960), Canadian politician from Quebec
- Sylvie Delacroix, British AI data, law and ethics professor
- Sylvie Desmarescaux (born 1950), French politician
- Sylvie Dézarnaud (born 1964), French politician
- Sylvie Fadlallah (born 1948), Lebanese diplomat
- Sylvie Fortier (born 1958), Canadian former synchronized swimming
- Sylvie Goulard (born 1964), French politician and civil servant
- Sylvie Honigman (born 1965), lecturer in ancient history at Tel Aviv University
- Sylvie Josserand (born 1968), French politician
- Sylvie Kauffmann (born 1955), French journalist
- Sylvie Leber, Australian musician, founder of the early 1980s feminist band Toxic Shock
- Sylvie Morel (born 1956), Canadian wheelchair fencer
- Sylvie Perrinjaquet (born 1955), Swiss politician
- Sylvie Pétiaux (1836–1919), French feminist and pacifist
- Sylvie Robineau (born 1956), New Caledonian politician
- Sylvie Testud (born 1971), French actress
- Sylvie Tolmont (born 1962), French politician
- Sylvie Vartan (born 1944), Bulgarian-French-Armenian singer and actress
- Sylvie Vauclair (born 1946), French astrophysicist
- Sylvie Yvert (born 1964), French novelist

=== Fictional characters ===
- Sylvie Brett, from the American TV series Chicago Fire
- Sylvie Carter, from the British soap opera EastEnders
- Sylvie Latham, from the Australian soap opera Neighbours
- Sylvie Lushton, from Marvel Comics, also known as Enchantress
- Sylvie (Marvel Cinematic Universe), an alternate version of Loki from the 2021 Disney+ series Loki

== See also ==
- Sylvi, given name
- Sylvia (disambiguation)
