= Silvia (disambiguation) =

Silvia is a given name and surname.

Silvia may also refer to:

- Silvia, Cauca, a municipality in the Cauca Department, Colombia
- Nissan Silvia, an automobile sold in Japan
- Silvia is the name of two plant genera:
  - Silvia in family Orobanchaceae
  - Silvia in family Lauraceae
    - Silvia anacardioides, S. polyantha, and S. rondonii have been moved to Mezia itauba
    - Other species have been moved to genus Mezilaurus
- Anilios silvia, species of snake in the family Typhlopidae
- Piezocera silvia, species of beetle in the family Cerambycidae
- Rhea Silvia, in Roman mythology
- Silvia (gens), legendary family in Roman mythology
- Silvia, a character in William Shakespeare's play The Two Gentlemen of Verona, the love interest of protagonist Valentine
- Silvia, a character in the Viewtiful Joe series
- Silvia, the original name of the character Sylvando in the Japanese version of Dragon Quest XI
- "Silvia" (song), a song by the Swedish indie pop band Miike Snow
- SILVIA, Symbolically Isolated Linguistically Variable Intelligence Algorithms, an artificial intelligence platform technology created by Cognitive Code
- Silvia Rock, Duroch Islands, Antarctica
- Tropical Storm Silvia, a 1964 weather event in the Pacific

== See also ==
- La Silvia
- Sylvia (disambiguation)
