= Silvija =

- Gender: Female
- Name day: March 10

Origin
- Origin: From Latin "Silvia"
- Region of origin: Latvia, Lithuania

Other names
- Related names: Silvia, Sylvia

Silvija is a Croatian, Latvian and Lithuanian and Serbian feminine given name. The associated name day is March 10.

== Notable people named Silvija ==
- Silvija Erdelji (born 1979), Serbian table tennis player
- Silvija Mrakovčić (born 1968), Croatian long jumper and triple-jumper
- Silvija Popović (born 1986), Serbian volleyball player
- Silvija Šimfa (born 1954), Latvian politician
- Silvija Talaja (born 1978), Croatian tennis player
