= Halonen =

Halonen is a Finnish surname. Notable people with the surname include:

- Antti Halonen (ice hockey) (b. 1982), ice hockey defenceman
- Arne Halonen (1898–1986), Finnish-American journalist and university teacher
- Arto Halonen (b. 1964), documentary filmmaker
- Brian Halonen (born 1999), American ice hockey player
- Eemil Halonen (1875–1950), sculptor
- George Halonen (1891–1954), Finnish-American journalist and cooperative organizer
- Kaija Halonen (b. 1954), ski orienteering competitor
- Niilo Halonen (1940–2025), ski jumper
- Paavali Halonen (1565–1642), warlord and settler in the 16th century
- Pekka Halonen (1865–1933), painter
- Simo Halonen (b. 1947), biathlete
- Tarja Halonen (b. 1943), politician and former President of Finland
- Yrjö Halonen (1862–1941), politician

== See also ==
- Halinen (surname)
