= Tourdan Situla =

Roman silver situla

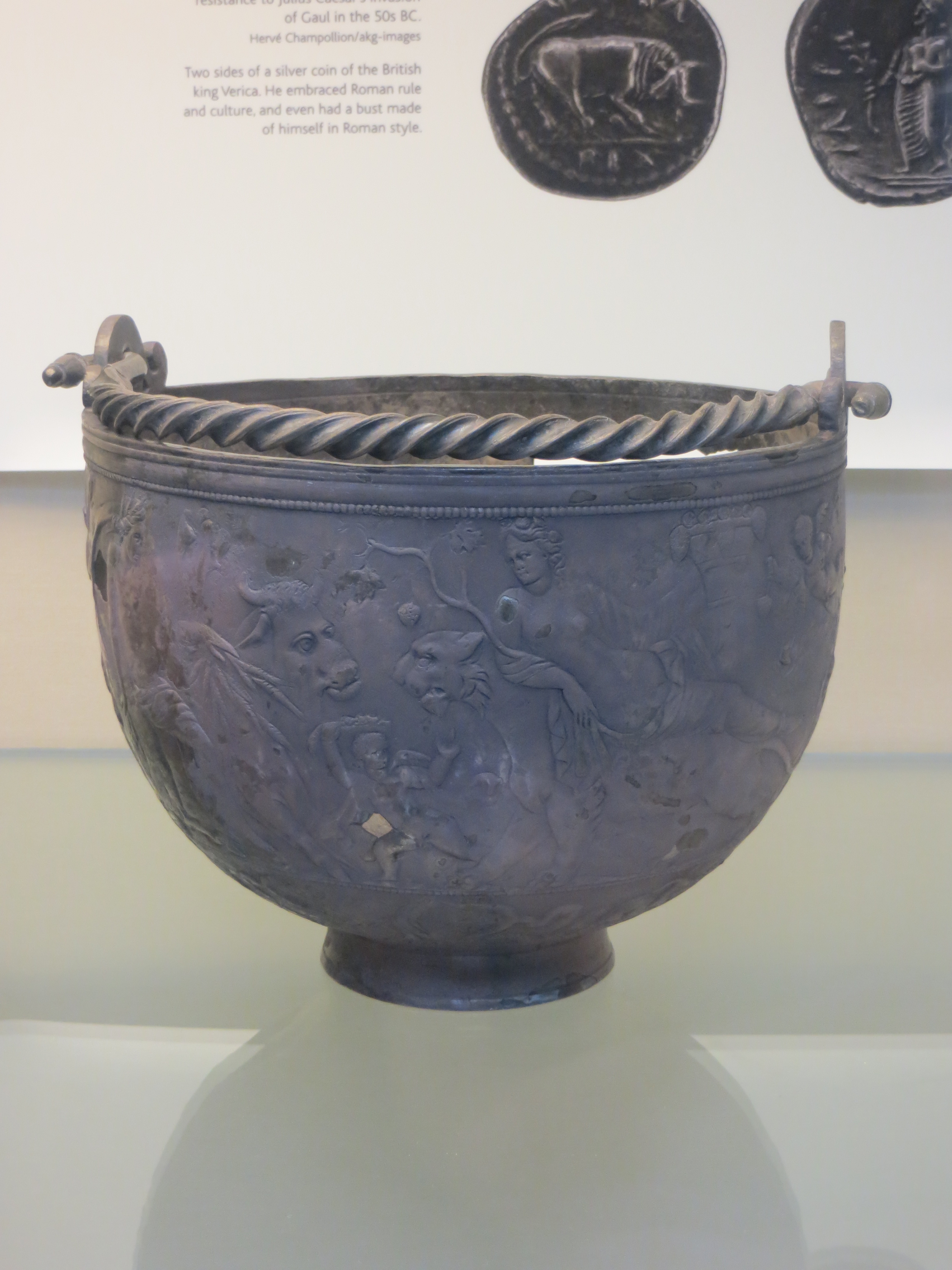
- Tourdan Situla as displayed in the British Museum
- Material: Silver
- Created: 150-250 AD
- Discovered: Revel-Tourdan, France
- Present location: British Museum, London

The Tourdan Situla is a Roman silver bucket discovered in the nineteenth century in the commune of Revel-Tourdan in the department of Isère in Auvergne-Rhône-Alpes, southeast France. This 18-centimetre-high hemispherical bucket, with a movable twisted handle, presents the personified seasons around its edge: the engravings represent women and animals. The vessel is dated to the second century AD and is a good example of Gallo-Roman art. Acquired by the British Museum in 1859, it is now part of the collection of the Department of Greek and Roman Antiquities.

== Provenance ==
On June 11, 1842, while digging in a field in Tourdan, workers discovered the silver vessel buried in the middle of the remains of a Roman villa. Partially damaged during its excavation, the vase was bought by Mr. Girard, director of a bookshop in Vienne, Isère. The announcement of its discovery in the Journal de Vienne aroused a lot of interest, including that of the noted writer and archaeologist Prosper Mérimée who wrote a detailed description of the object. In 1859, it was purchased by the British Museum and entered the collections of Greek and Roman Antiquities Department. It briefly returned to France in 1989 for an exhibition in Lyon devoted to Gallo-Roman goldsmithing.

== Description ==
The situla is 18 cm high, with a diameter of 20.9 cm at the top and 8.5 cm at its base. Its handle is 22.8 cm high. The vessel has a straight edge, curved at the base, supported by an annular foot. It is framed by two fasteners pierced with a hole allowing the hooks to hold a twisted handle. The outer edge of the situla features a beaded moulding. This solid silver vase is partially corroded and turned black due to the fact that it was buried and in contact with a circular dish.

Prosper Mérimée is quoted as saying that "The mobile handle is very thick and twisted into a spiral. I have rarely seen, even in Pompeii, a more beautiful and important piece, and it would be deplorable if it entered a private collection".

== Frieze of the Four Seasons ==
The situla is engraved with a frieze illustrating the four seasons. Spring is depicted as a young woman, beautiful, naked and floral, seated as an amazon on the back of a panther that follows the movement of the sun. Two genii fly over them and go in their direction. Summer is a woman dressed in a veil at the waist blown away by a light breeze. She is sitting on a crouching bull. The genii bear the attributes of working the land. Autumn is more dressed than the two previous women with a veil covering her arms. The woman is lying on a panther, an animal dedicated to Bacchus, god of wine. The angels bring fruit to the woman and the procession follows the movement of the sun. Winter is an elderly woman, her face veiled; she seems to be slumped over a game that is itself at rest.

The corrosion present on the vessel suggests that it was buried with a circular dish. The bucket is damaged at the bottom and on its exterior, probably because of the pickaxe that discovered it. This iconographia associating women embodying the seasons with animals can be found on the sarcophagi of the Nereids in Nero's Domus Aurea in Rome and on a late mosaic at Littlecote Roman Villa in England.

== Original Purpose ==
This large bucket was originally used to hold wine. Roman tradition placed great importance on drinking wine, especially when devoted to their gods, which would explain the beauty of this utilitarian vessel. This vessel was placed in the triclinium of the villa. Vessels of this type probably date, like those in bronze, from the years 150 to 250.

== See also ==
- Mâcon Treasure
- Chaourse Treasure
- Caubiac Treasure
- Chatuzange Treasure
- Berthouville Treasure
- Beaurains Treasure

== Gallery ==
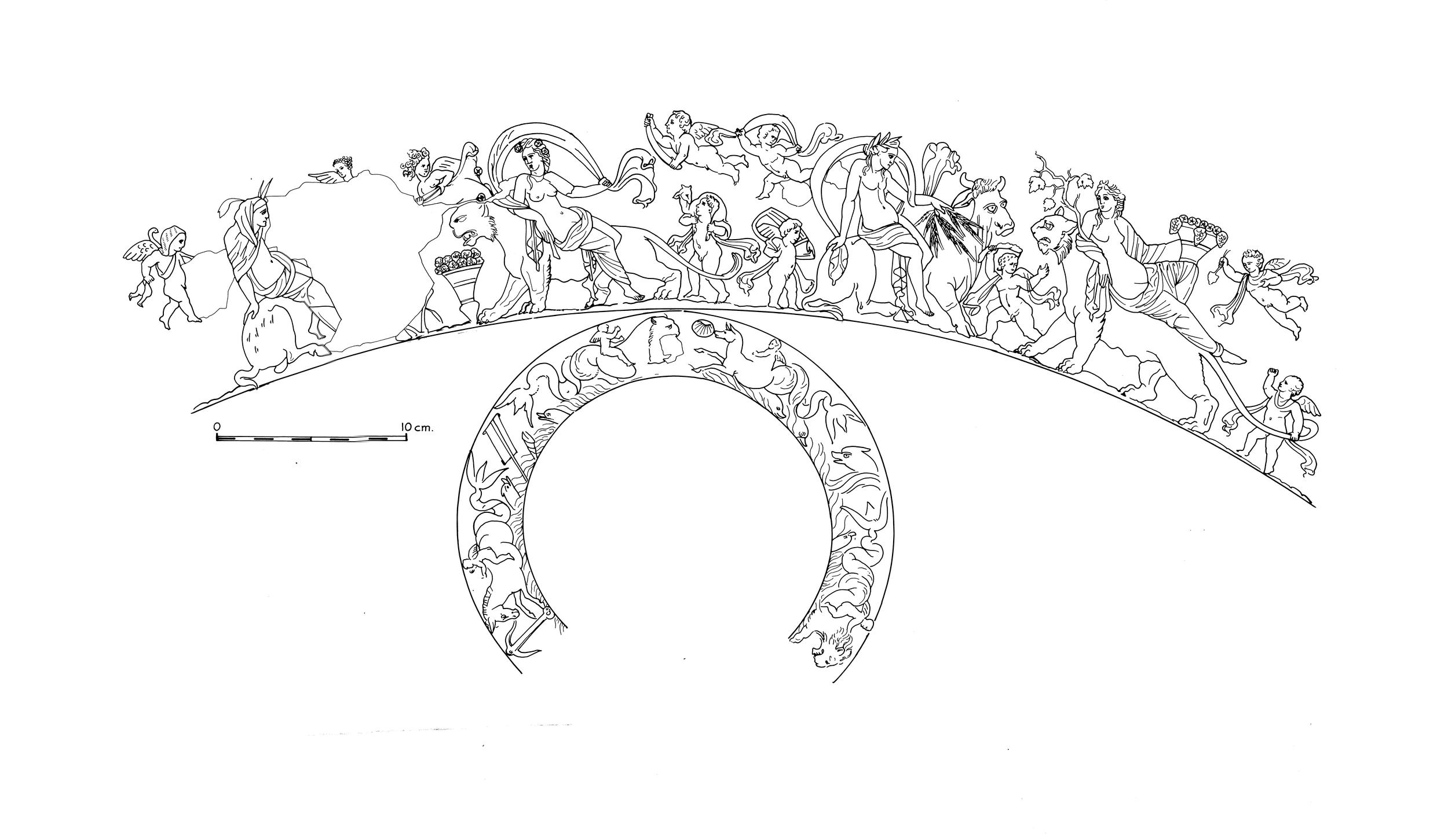
Reproduction of the frieze surrounding the vessel

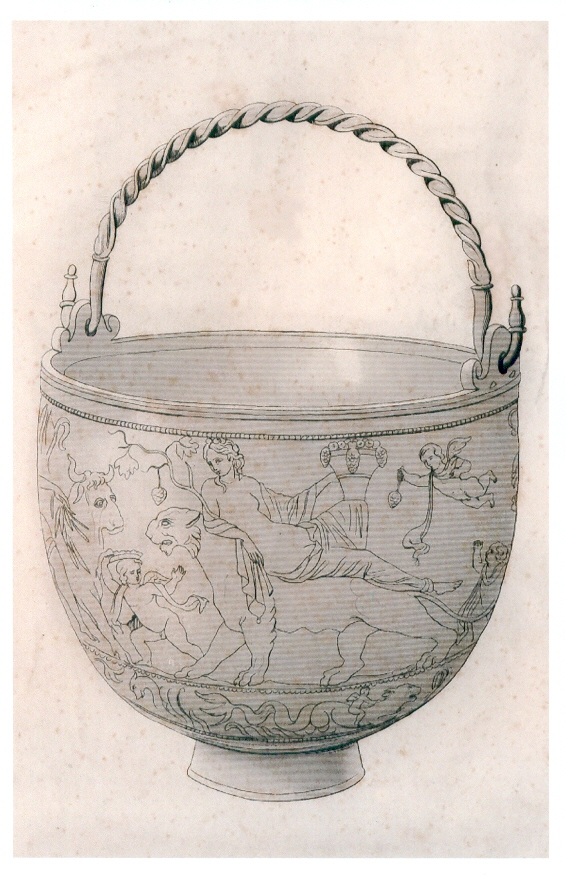
Illustration of the antique silver situla discovered in Tourdan in 1842 representing the four seasons.

== Bibliography ==
- D. Strong, Greek and Roman Silver Plate (British Museum Press, 1966)
- L. Burn, The British Museum Book of Greek and Roman Art (British Museum Press, 1991)
- S. Walker, Roman Art (British Museum Press, 1991)
