= Robineau =

Robineau is a French surname. Notable people with the surname include:

- Abbé Alexandre-Auguste Robineau (1747–1828), French violinist, composer, conductor, painter, and priest
- Adelaïde Alsop Robineau (1865–1929), American painter, potter and ceramist
- Jean-Baptiste Robineau-Desvoidy (1799–1857), French physician and entomologist
- Joseph Robineau de Villebon (1655–1700), governor of Acadia
- Sylvie Robineau (born 1956), New Caledonian politician
