= Halinen (surname) =

Halinen is a Finnish surname. Notable people with the surname include:

- Simo Halinen (born 1963) is a Finnish film director, screenwriter, actor and author
- Sylvi Halinen (22 June 1908 – 16 August 1995) was a Finnish agronomist, farmer and politician
- Tia Hälinen (born 1994), Finnish footballer

== See also ==
- Halonen
