= Silas (disambiguation) =

Silas (/ˈsaɪ.ləs/; Greek: Σίλας/Σιλουανός; fl. 1st century AD) was a leading member of the Early Christian community.

Silas or SILAS may also refer to:

- Silas (name), a given and last name
- Silas, Alabama, a town in the United States
- Society for Irish Latin American Studies (SILAS)
- Silas (TV series)
- Silas (film), a 2017 documentary film
- Silas Molema, a South African doctor, politician, author and activist
- Silas (Portuguese footballer) (born 1976)
- Silas (footballer, born 1985), Brazilian footballer
- Silas (footballer, born 1996), Brazilian footballer
- Silas Katompa Mvumpa, known simply as Silas, Congolese footballer (born 1998)
- Silas, a pen name of American cartoonist Winsor McCay

== See also ==
- Sila (disambiguation)
