= Sylvia =

Sylvia may refer to:

== People ==
- Sylvia (given name)
- Sylvia (singer), American country music and country pop singer and songwriter
- Sylvia Robinson, American singer, record producer, and record label executive
- Sylvia Vrethammar, Swedish singer credited as "Sylvia" in Australia and the UK
- Tim Sylvia, American mixed martial arts fighter
- Colin Sylvia, Australian football player
- Mark Sylvia, American politician
- Michael Sylvia, American politician

== Places ==
- Mount Sylvia, a former name of Xueshan on Taiwan Island
- Mount Sylvia, Queensland, Australia
- Sylvia, Kansas, a town in Kansas, United States
- Sylvia's Restaurant of Harlem, New York City, New York, United States
- Fort Sylvia, now Kapit, Sarawak, Malaysia

== Art, entertainment, and media ==
=== Comics ===
- Sylvia (comic strip), a long-running comic strip by cartoonist Nicole Hollander

=== Films ===
- Sylvia (1961 film), an Australian television play
- Sylvia (1965 film), an American drama film
- Sylvia (1985 film), a New Zealand film about New Zealand educator Sylvia Ashton-Warner
- Sylvia (1985 Canadian film), a Canadian animated short film
- Sylvia (2003 film), a British biographical drama film about the romance between prominent poets Sylvia Plath and Ted Hughes

=== Literature ===
- Sylvia, a 1913 novel published as the work of Upton Sinclair, written by his wife Mary Craig Kimbrough Sinclair
- Sylvia (novel), a 2006 historical novel by Bryce Courtenay
- Sylvia (play), a play by A.R. Gurney

=== Music ===
- An Sylvia, an 1826 work by Franz Schubert
- "Sylvia", a 1914 love song by Oley Speaks, sung by Paul Robeson
- "Sylvia" (Focus song), a single from the 1972 Focus album Focus III
- "Sylvia", a single from the 2009 album Hospice by The Antlers
- "Sylvia's Mother", 1972 single by Dr. Hook & the Medicine Show
- "Sylvia" (Elvis Presley song), a song by Elvis Presley from the 1972 album Elvis Now

=== Stage performances ===
- Sylvia (ballet) or Sylvia ou La Nymphe de Diane, a classical ballet with music written by Léo Delibes in 1876
- Sylvia (musical), a musical on the life of Sylvia Pankhurst, premiered at the Old Vic in September 2018

=== Video games ===
- Sylvia Christel, a character in the No More Heroes series

== Science ==
- Sylvia (bird), a genus of birds containing the "typical warblers"
- 87 Sylvia, an asteroid

== Sports ==
- IF Sylvia, a Swedish football club

== Ships ==
- USS Sylvia, the name of more than one United States Navy ship

== See also ==
- '
- Nissan Silvia
- Silvia (disambiguation)
- Sylvi, given name
- Sylvie (disambiguation)
- Sylwia, given name
- "Who is Sylvia?", a song in Shakespeare's play The Two Gentlemen of Verona
