= Piezocera flavipennis =

Scientific classification
- Domain: Eukaryota
- Kingdom: Animalia
- Phylum: Arthropoda
- Class: Insecta
- Order: Coleoptera
- Suborder: Polyphaga
- Infraorder: Cucujiformia
- Family: Cerambycidae
- Genus: Piezocera
- Species: P. flavipennis

Binomial name
- Piezocera flavipennis (Zajciw, 1970)

Species of beetle

Piezocera flavipennis is a species of beetle in the family Cerambycidae. It was described by Zajciw in 1970.
