= Piezocera =

Scientific classification
- Domain: Eukaryota
- Kingdom: Animalia
- Phylum: Arthropoda
- Class: Insecta
- Order: Coleoptera
- Suborder: Polyphaga
- Infraorder: Cucujiformia
- Family: Cerambycidae
- Tribe: Piezocerini
- Genus: Piezocera

Genus of beetles

Piezocera is a genus of beetles in the family Cerambycidae, containing the following species:

- Piezocera advena Martins, 1976
- Piezocera aenea (Bates, 1867)
- Piezocera araujosilvai Melzer, 1935
- Piezocera ataxia Martins, 1976
- Piezocera bivittata Audinet-Serville, 1834
- Piezocera costula Martins, 1976
- Piezocera flavipennis (Zajciw, 1970)
- Piezocera gratiosa Lameere, 1893
- Piezocera monochroa Bates, 1885
- Piezocera nodicollis Melzer, 1934
- Piezocera rufula Martins & Galileo, 2010
- Piezocera serraticollis Linell, 1897
- Piezocera silvia Galileo & Martins, 2000
