= Piezocera aenea =

Scientific classification
- Domain: Eukaryota
- Kingdom: Animalia
- Phylum: Arthropoda
- Class: Insecta
- Order: Coleoptera
- Suborder: Polyphaga
- Infraorder: Cucujiformia
- Family: Cerambycidae
- Genus: Piezocera
- Species: P. aenea

Binomial name
- Piezocera aenea (Bates, 1867)

Species of beetle

Piezocera aenea is a species of beetle in the family Cerambycidae. It was described by Bates in 1867.
