= Piezocera rufula =

Scientific classification
- Domain: Eukaryota
- Kingdom: Animalia
- Phylum: Arthropoda
- Class: Insecta
- Order: Coleoptera
- Suborder: Polyphaga
- Infraorder: Cucujiformia
- Family: Cerambycidae
- Genus: Piezocera
- Species: P. rufula

Binomial name
- Piezocera rufula Martins & Galileo, 2010

Species of beetle

Piezocera rufula is a species of beetle in the family Cerambycidae. It was described by Martins and Galileo in 2010.
