= José Juan Arrom =

Latin American literature and cultural studies scholar

- Born: February 28, 1910; Holguín, Cuba
- Died: April 12, 2007 (aged 97); Acton, Massachusetts
- Occupations: Professor, Scholar of Latin American culture

Academic background
- Education: Yale University

José Juan Arrom (February 28, 1910 - April 12, 2007) was a leading authority on Latin American cultural studies and a pioneer in shaping the field in the United States at a time when most Spanish departments mainly taught about peninsular Spain. He is particularly well-known for his studies of Latin American theater, Cuban culture and lexicology, and the myths of the pre-Columbian inhabitants of the Caribbean. He was a professor of Latin American Literature at Yale University for nearly 40 years.

== Background ==
Arrom was born in Holguín, Cuba in 1910 to a Cuban mother and Mayorquín father. He grew up in the small town of Mayarí, where his father had a dry goods store. He worked at a sugar mill in what was then Preston, Cuba, now known as Guatemala, Cuba, until August 1932. He initially emigrated to the United States in 1928, returned to Cuba in 1930, and then moved back to the US permanently in 1932, where he later attended the Mount Herman School in Northfield, Massachusetts. In 1934 he entered Yale University and earned three degrees: a Bachelor of Arts (1937), a Master of Arts (1940), and a Ph.D. in Philosophy (1941). He was one of the first Latin American scholars to obtain a doctorate from a North American university. His dissertation, "Historia de la literatura dramatica cubana", focused on the interactions between Spanish sailors and the Natives near Santiago de Cuba, and introduced the idea of dramatic texts and the theatre's capability to dissipate prejudices among the academic establishment of Latin American history. In 1947, he married Silvia Ravelo from Santiago de Cuba. The couple lived in New Haven, Connecticut and had two children, José Orlando Arrom and historian Silvia Marina Arrom.

== Career ==
Arrom spent his entire career teaching at Yale University. In addition to offering courses on Latin American literature, he served as director of graduate studies in Spanish from 1952 to 1968. He also helped build the Latin American Collection of the Yale University Library, where he served as curator from 1942 to 1962. He retired as Professor Emeritus in 1976. Rolena Adorno praised him as "one of the true founders" of Yale's Department of Spanish and Portuguese and explained that "his contributions to the history of Latin American literature form part of the permanent record of the development of our discipline." Arrom also lectured over the summers at the Universidad de La Habana (1946), at the Instituto Caro y Cuervo in Colombia (1960), and the University of Arizona (1960), amongst other institutions.

== Works ==
Arrom has written more than a dozen books and numerous scholarly articles exploring a wide range of subjects and time periods. His survey of nearly five hundred years of Latin American literature, the Esquema generacional de las letras hispanoamericanas (1963) and Hispanoamérica: panorama contemporáneo de su cultura (1969) have been his most famous works. He discovered and edited two texts related to the Spanish conquest of the Americas: Fernán Pérez de Oliva's Historia de la invención de las Indias (1965), and Ramón Pané’s Account of the Antiquities of the Indians – the only one of his books to be translated into English (1999). His studies of the Virgen de la Caridad del Cobre (Our Lady of Charity) and of the origin and meaning of the term criollo are now classics, and have been reproduced many times. He also authored the section on Spanish American drama for the Handbook of Latin American Studies from 1948 to 1955. His last publication, De donde crecen las palmas (2005), is a collection that pairs some of his scholarly essays with his memoir, Recuerdos de un niño de Mayarí que viajó a la región de las nieves. Jorge Ulloa Hung and Julio Corbea Calzado authored a book entitled, José Juan Arrom y la búsqueda de nuestras raíces (2011) to pay tribute to Arrom's contributions as a critic, essayist, and researcher.

In 1979, when he received an award from the Hispanic Caucus of the U.S. Congress, Georgette M. Dorn of the Library of Congress interviewed him for the Library's Archive of Hispanic Literature on Tape.

In March 1997, Arrom organized an exhibition at El Museo del Barrio along with Ricardo E. Alegría and Dicey Taylor. Taíno: Pre-Columbian Art and Culture from the Caribbean was the first comprehensive presentation of Taíno works in North America. Holland Cotter considered it "both a landmark of scholarly achievement and a riveting visual experience."

== Awards and honors ==
Arrom's many honorary memberships included the Connecticut Academy of Arts and Sciences, the Ateneo Americano (Washington, D.C.), the Instituto de Historia del Teatro Americano (Buenos Aires), the North American Academy of the Spanish Language, the Real Academia Española de la Lengua (Spain), the Unión de Escritores y Artistas de Cuba, and the Asociación de Lingüistas de Cuba. His awards include:

- 1938 - Hijo Ilustre de Mayarí, Cuba
- 1979 - Premio Ollantay for research in Latin American Theater, Venezuela
- 1979 - Diploma of Appreciation for Contribution to Hispanic Scholarship in America, Congressional Hispanic Caucus and National Endowment for the Humanities, U.S.
- 1982 - Profesor Honoris Causa en Letras y Artes, Universidad de la Habana, Cuba
- 1982 - Medalla Alejo Carpentier, Cuba
- 1983 - Orden Félix Varela, Primer Grado, Cuba
- 1989 - Medalla Haydée Santamaría, Casa de las Américas, Cuba
- 1991 - Orden Sol de Carabobo, Grado de Gran Oficial, Universidad de Carabobo, Venezuela
- 1994 - Doctor Honoris Causa en Filosofía y Letras, Centro de Estudios Avanzados de Puerto Rico y el Caribe, Puerto Rico

== Publications ==
=== Books (only first editions listed) ===
- Historia de la literatura dramática cubana (1944)
- Estudios de literatura hispanoamericana (1950)
- Historia del teatro hispanoamericano: época colonial (1956)
- Certidumbre de America: Estudios de letras, folklore y cultura (1959)
- Esquema generacional de las letras hispanoamericanas: Estudio de un método (1963)
- Hispanoamérica: panorama contemporáneo de su cultura (1969)
- Mitología y artes prehispánicas de las Antillas (1975)
- Estudios de lexicología antillana (1980)
- En el fiel de América. Estudios de literatura hispanoamericana (1985)
- El murciélago y la lechuza en la cultura taína, edited with Manuel A. García Arévalo (1988)
- Imaginación del Nuevo Mundo: Diez estudios sobre los inicios de la narrativa hispanoamericana (1991)
- De donde crecen las palmas, with Silvia Marina Arrom and Judith A. Weiss (2005)

=== Critical editions (introduction and notes by Arrom) ===
- Santiago de Pita, El Príncipe jardinero y fingido cloridiano, comedia sin fama del capitán don Santiago de Pita, natural de La Habana (1951)
- Hernán Pérez de Oliva, Historia de la invención de las Indias (1965)
- Ramón Pané, Relación acerca de las antigüedades de los indios. El primer tratado escrito en América (1974)
- Tres piezas teatrales del Virreinato, with José Rojas Garcidueñas ( 1976)
- José de Acosta, Peregrinación de don Bartolomé Lorenzo (1982)
- Ramón Pané, An Account of the Antiquities of the Indians: Chronicles of the New World Encounter (1999)

=== Selected articles ===
- “Poesía afrocubana,” Revista Iberoamericana, IV (1942), 379-411.
- “El teatro de José Antonio Ramos,” Revista Iberoamericana, XII, 24 (1947), 263-271.
- “Criollo: definición y matices de un concepto,” in Certidumbre de América: Estudios de Letras, Folklore y Cultura (1959), 9-26.
- “Raíz popular de los ‘Versos Sencillos’ de José Martí,” in Antología Crítica de José Martí, ed. Manuel Pedro González (1960), 411-426.
- “La Virgen del Cobre: historia, leyenda y símbolo sincrético,” in Certidumbre de América: Estudios de letras, folklore y cultura, 2d ed. (1971), 184-214.
- “Lo tradicional cubano en el mundo novelístico de José Lezama Lima,” Revista Iberoamericana, 92-93 (1975), 469-477.
- “Bartolomé de las Casas, iniciador de la narrativa de protesta,” Revista de Crítica Literaria Latinoamericana, VII, 16 (1982), 27-39.
- “The Taínos: Principal Inhabitants of Columbus’ Indies,” with Irving Rouse, in Circa 1492: Art in the Age of Exploration, ed. Jay A. Levenson (1991), 509-513.
- “Las primeras imágenes opuestas y el debate sobre la dignidad del indio,” in De palabra y obra en el Nuevo Mundo, ed. Miguel León-Portilla et al. (1992), vol. 1, 63-85.
- “En demanda de Cathay: lo real y lo imaginario en el Diario del primer viaje de Colón,” Boletín de la Academia Norteamericana de la Lengua Española, 8 (1992), 9-23.
- “Fray Ramón Pané, Discoverer of the Taíno People,” in Amerindian Images and the Legacy of Columbus, ed. René Jara and Nicholas Spadaccini (1992), 266-290.
- “The Creation Myths of the Taíno,” in Fátima Bercht and Estrellita Brodsky, eds., Taíno: Pre-columbian Art and Culture from the Caribbean (1998), 68-79.
