= Georges Colombier =

French politician

Deputy for Isère's 7th constituency in the National Assembly of France
- In office 12 June 1988 – 19 June 2012
- Preceded by: none (proportional representation)
- Succeeded by: Jean-Pierre Barbier
- Parliamentary group: UDF (1988-1993) UDFC (1993-1997); UDF (1997-2002) UMP (2002-2012)

Personal details
- Born: 8 March 1940 (age 86) Jallieu (Isère)

Georges Colombier (born 8 March 1940 in Bourgoin-Jallieu, Isère) was a member of the National Assembly of France from 1986 to 2012. He represented the 7th constituency of the Isère department, as a member of a number of groups, most recently the Union for a Popular Movement.
