= Sylvi =

Sylvi is a given name. Notable people with the name include:

- Sylvi Bratten (born 1973), Norwegian politician
- Sylvi Graham (1951–2025), Norwegian politician
- Sylvi Halinen (1908–1995), Finnish farmer, agronomist and politician
- Sylvi Kekkonen (1900–1974), Finnish writer and First Lady of Finland
- Sylvi Keskinen (1933–2013), Finnish hurdler
- Sylvi-Kyllikki Kilpi (1899–1987), Finnish politician
- Sylvi Listhaug (born 1977), Norwegian politician
- Sylvi Palo (1911–1987), Finnish actress
- Sylvi Saimo (1914–2004), Finnish sprint canoeist
- Sylvi Salonen (1920–2003), Finnish actress
- Sylvi Siltanen (1909–1986), Finnish politician

== See also ==
- Silvi (disambiguation)
- Sylvia (disambiguation)
- Sylvie (disambiguation)
