= Piezocera ataxia =

Scientific classification
- Domain: Eukaryota
- Kingdom: Animalia
- Phylum: Arthropoda
- Class: Insecta
- Order: Coleoptera
- Suborder: Polyphaga
- Infraorder: Cucujiformia
- Family: Cerambycidae
- Genus: Piezocera
- Species: P. ataxia

Binomial name
- Piezocera ataxia Martins, 1976

Species of beetle

Piezocera ataxia is a species of beetle in the family Cerambycidae. It was described by Martins in 1976.
