= Monique Limon =

French politician

Deputy for Isère's 7th constituency in the National Assembly of France
- In office 18 June 2017 – 2022
- Preceded by: Jean-Pierre Barbier (LR)
- Succeeded by: Yannick Neuder (LR)

Personal details
- Born: 5 December 1953 (age 72) Paris
- Party: LREM
- Education: Grenoble Institute of Political Studies

Monique Limon (born 5 December 1953 in Paris) is a French educator and politician of La République En Marche! (LREM) who served as a member the National Assembly from 2017 to 2022, representing the 7th constituency of the Isère department.

== Early career ==
Before entering politics, Limon worked as a specialist at schools for troubled teens.

== Political career ==
Limon served as the deputy mayor for the Bressieux commune as an independent. She had planned on competing for the 2017 French parliamentary election with the Socialist Party (PS), but instead decided to join En Marche!

In parliament, Limon served on the Committee on Economic Affairs (2017–2019) and the Committee on Social Affairs (2019–2020) before moving to the Committee on Legal Affairs (2020–2022). In this capacity, she was the parliament's rapporteur on legislation aimed at opening adoption to unmarried couples.

== Controversy ==
In November 2021, news media reported that Limon had received anonymous death threats.
