= Sylvie Dézarnaud =

French politician (born 1964)

Member of the National Assembly for Isère's 7th constituency
- Incumbent
- Assumed office 24 January 2025
- Preceded by: Yannick Neuder
- Succeeded by: Yannick Neuder

Personal details
- Born: 23 February 1964 (age 62) Sainte-Colombe, Rhône, France
- Party: Republican

Sylvie Dézarnaud (born 23 February 1964) is a French politician who is member of the National Assembly for Isère's 7th constituency. Following the appointment of Yannick Neuder to the post of Minister responsible for Health and Access to Care, Sylvie Dézarnaud replaced him as deputy for this constituency as his substitute.

== Biography ==
Until 2020, Sylvie Dézarnaud was a construction assistant in a construction company.

She was mayor of Revel-Tourdan from 2008 to 2020, president of the Entre Bièvre et Rhône community of communes from 2020 to 2025 and regional councilor since 2021. In the 2024 French legislative election she was the substitute for Yannick Neuder. When he was appointed minister on 23 December 2024, she replaced him in the National Assembly from 24 January 2025 to 5 November 2025.

== See also ==
- List of deputies of the 17th National Assembly of France
