= Sylwia =

Sylwia is a given name. Notable people with the name include:

- Sylwia Ejdys (born 1984), Polish middle-distance runner
- Sylwia Gliwa (born 1978), Polish actress
- Sylwia Gruchała (born 1981), Polish fencer
- Sylwia Jaśkowiec (born 1986), Polish cross-country skier
- Sylwia Julito (born 1929), Polish Olympic fencer
- Sylwia Korzeniowska (born 1980), Polish race walker
- Sylwia Nowak (born 1976), Polish ice dancer
- Sylwia Parys (born 1988), Polish singer
- Sylwia Pusz (born 1972), Polish politician

== See also ==
- Sylvia (given name)
