= Yannick Neuder =

French politician

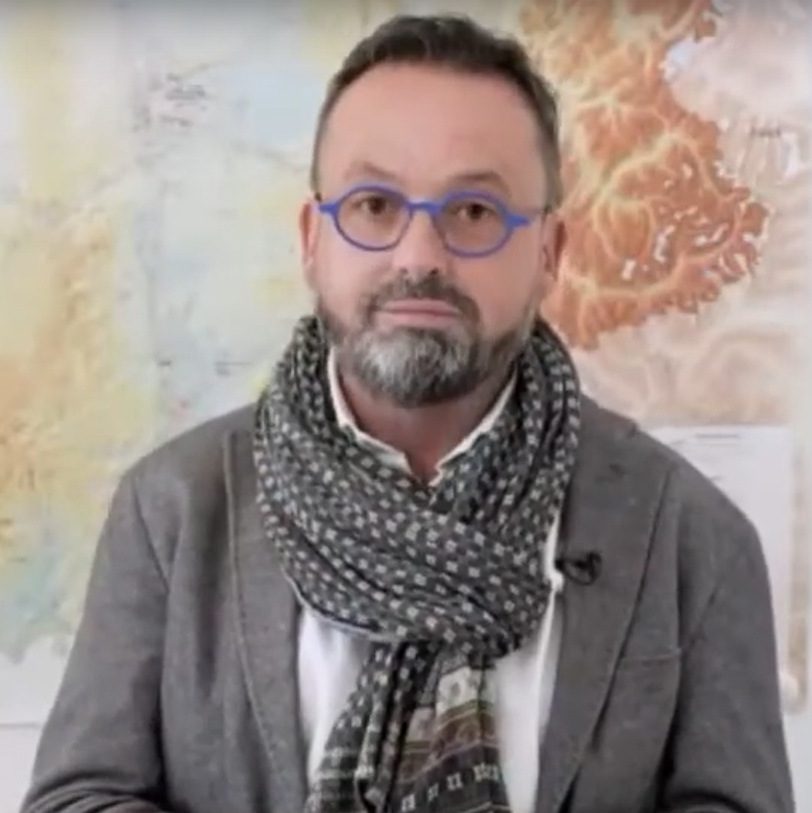
- Yannick Neuder in 2021

Minister of Health and Access to Care
- In office 23 December 2024 – 2025
- Prime Minister: François Bayrou
- Preceded by: Geneviève Darrieussecq

Member of the National Assembly for Isère's 7th constituency
- In office 22 June 2022 – 23 January 2025
- Preceded by: Monique Limon
- Succeeded by: Sylvie Dézarnaud

Member of the Regional Council of Auvergne-Rhône-Alpes
- Incumbent
- Assumed office 1 January 2016

Personal details
- Born: 15 March 1969 (age 57) Tullins, Isère, France
- Party: The Republicans
- Education: Grenoble Alpes University; Sciences Po Grenoble
- Profession: Cardiologist

Yannick Neuder (born 15 March 1969) in Tullins is a French cardiologist and politician of the Republicans (LR) who served as Minister Delegate for Health and Access to Care in the government of Prime Minister François Bayrou from 2024 to 2025.

== Political career ==
Neuder served was mayor of Saint-Étienne-de-Saint-Geoirs from 2002 to 2019 as well as president of the Bièvre Isère Community of Communes from 2014 to 2022.

Neuder has been a member of the Regional Council of Auvergne-Rhône-Alpes since 2016 and was re-elected in 2021. On the Regional Council, he is the 10th vice-president, with responsibility for Higher education, research and innovation, health and European funds.

From 2022 to 2024, Neuder was as a member of the National Assembly, representing Isère's 7th constituency. In parliament, he served on the Committee on Social Affairs and the Parliamentary Office for the Evaluation of Scientific and Technological Choices (OPECST). In this capacity, he was the parliament’s rapporteur on the 2024 Social Security Financing Act (LFSS).

=== Minister of Health, 2024–2025 ===
On 23 December 2024, Neuder was appointed Minister of Health. Following his appointment, he stated that he wanted to be seen as the "Retailleau of Health", a reference to Interior Minister Bruno Retailleau's popularity.

In the Republicans' 2025 leadership election, Neuder endorsed Laurent Wauquiez to succeed Éric Ciotti as the party's new chair.

== Personal life ==
Neuder has four children.
