= Sylvia (given name) =

- Gender: Feminine

Origin
- Language: Latin
- Meaning: "Forest"

Other names
- Alternative spelling: Silvia
- Variant forms: Sylvi, Sylvie

Sylvia is a feminine given name of Latin origin. The French form is Sylvie. The name originates from the Latin word for forest Silva and its meaning is spirit of the wood. The mythological god of the forest was associated with the figure of Silvanus.

Sylvia was the 137th most popular girl's name in Britain in 1900.

== People ==
- Sylvia (singer) (born 1956), American country singer born Sylvia Jane Kirby
- Sylvia Anderson (1927–2016), British voice artist and film producer
- Sylvia Ashby (1908–1978), Australian market-researcher
- Sylvia Ashton-Warner (1908–1984), New Zealand writer, poet and educator
- Sylvia Beach (1887–1962), American-born bookseller and publisher
- Sylvia Bermann (1922–2012), Argentine psychiatrist, public health specialist, essayist, and montenero
- Sylvia Browne (1936–2013), American psychic
- Sylvia Chang (born 1953), Taiwanese actress, producer and director
- Sylvia Chase (1938–2019), American broadcast journalist
- Sylvia Coleman, American health journalist, author, speaker and expert in sexual abuse prevention
- Sylvia Constantinidis (born 1962), Venezuelan-American pianist, conductor and composer
- Sylvia Crawley (born 1972), American basketball player
- Sylvia Day (born 1973), American romance writer
- Sylvia Earle (born 1935), American oceanographer and aquanaut
- Sylvia Martínez Elizondo (1947–2020), Mexican politician
- Sylvia Esterby, Canadian statistician
- Sylvia Fernando (1904–1983), Sri Lankan educator and family planning advocate
- Sylvia Fowles (born 1985), American basketball player and coach
- Sylvia Gale (1950– 2020), American activist and politician
- Sylvia Gray (1909–1991), English businessperson
- Sylvia Grot, American politician
- Sylvia Gyde (1936–2024), British public health doctor and medical researcher
- Sylwia Gruchała (born 1981), Polish fencer
- Sylvia Hanika (born 1959), German tennis player
- Sylvia La Torre (1933–2022), Filipina singer and actress
- Sylvia Laughter (1950s-2022), American politician
- Sylvia Likens (1949–1965), American murder victim
- Sylvia Marsters (born 1962), New Zealand and Cook Islands artist
- Sylvia McNair (born 1956), American singer
- Sylvia Meagher, World Health Organization analyst who devoted the last decades of her life to researching and writing about the JFK assassination.
- Sylvia Mendez (born 1936), American civil rights activist
- Sylvia Michel (footballer) (born 1972), German footballer
- Sylvia Michel (minister) (1935–2025), Swiss Reformed Church minister
- Sylvia Mitchell (born 1937), Australian long jumper
- Sylvia Molloy (writer) (1938–2022), Argentine academic and writer
- Sylvia Namutebi, Uganda beauty pageant titleholder
- Sylvia Pankhurst (1882–1960), British suffragette and Marxist
- Sylvia Pedlar (1900–1972), American lingerie designer
- Sylvia Pille-Steppat (born 1967), German adaptive rower
- Sylvia Plath (1932–1963), American confessional poet
- Sylvia Poggioli (born 1946), Radio news anchor
- Sylvia Ratonel (born 1988), Singaporean singer and spokesmodel
- Sylvia Rivera (1951–2002), American transgender activist
- Sylvia Robinson (1935–2011), American rhythm & blues singer, member of Mickey & Sylvia, and record label executive
- Sylvia Ruuska (1942–2019), American medley and freestyle swimmer
- Sylvia Sanchez, (born 1971 as Josette Campo), Filipino actress
- Sylvia Schofield (1916–2006), British writer and traveller
- Sylvia Siddell (1941–2011), New Zealand artist
- Sylvia Sidney (1910–1999), American actress
- Sylvia Sleigh (1916–2010), Welsh-American painter
- Sylvia Steinbrecht (born 1977) Andorran artistic film director and production designer
- Sylvia Syms (1934–2023), English actress
- Sylvia Thalberg (1907–1988), American screenwriter
- Sylvia Tyson (born 1940), Canadian musician, performer, singer-songwriter and broadcaster
- Sylvie Vartan (born 1944), Bulgarian-French singer and actress
- Sylvia Vrethammar (born 1945), Swedish singer
- Sylvia Wene (1928–2013), American ten-pin bowler
- Sylvia Weve (born 1954), Dutch illustrator
- Sylvia Whitman (born 1981), Anglo-French bookseller
- Sylvia Wynter (born 1928), Jamaican writer and cultural theorist

== Fictional characters ==
- Sylvia Costas, Assistant District Attorney in the American television drama NYPD Blue
- Sylvia Goodwin, the mother of Roy Cropper in the ITV soap opera Coronation Street
- Sylvia Hollamby Character in the ITV prison drama Bad Girls (TV series) played by Helen Fraser
- Sylvia Noble, a character from British science fiction TV series Doctor Who
- Sylvia Rosen, a character from season 6 of Mad Men

== See also ==
- Sylvia (disambiguation)
- Sylvia, a genus term for birds
