= Isère's 7th constituency =

Constituency of the National Assembly of France

7th constituency of Isère
- inline Constituency of the National Assembly of France

- Constituency in Department

- Location of Isère in France
- Deputy: Sylvie Dézarnaud; LR
- Department: Isère

The 7th constituency of Isère is one of ten French legislative constituencies in the Isère département.

After the 2010 redistricting of French legislative constituencies added a tenth constituency to Isère, the 7th constituency consists of the (pre-2015 cantonal re-organisation) cantons of Beaurepaire, La Côte-Saint-André, Grand-Lemps, Roybon, Saint-Etienne-de-Saint-Geoirs, Saint-Jean-de-Bournay, Virieu and part of Roussillon.

== Deputies ==
Election	Member	Party
1988	Georges Colombier	UDF
1993	Georges Colombier	UPF - UDF
1997	Georges Colombier	UDF - PR
2002	Georges Colombier	UDF - UMP
2007	Georges Colombier	UMP
2012	Jean-Pierre Barbier	UMP
2017	Monique Limon	REM
2022	Yannick Neuder	LR
2024	Yannick Neuder	LR
2025	Sylvie Dézarnaud	LR

== Election results ==
=== 2024 ===
Candidate	Party	Alliance	First round			Second round		
Candidate	Party	Alliance	Votes	%	+/–	Votes	%	+/–
Benoît Auguste	RN		28,531	42.10	+18.47	30,623	45.67	+5.26
Yannick Neuder	LR	UDC	18,678	27.56	+2.72	36,434	54.33	-5.26
Dominique Dichard	PCF	NFP	13,427	19.81	-1.14	withdrew		
Helena Chesser	REN	Ensemble	6,507	9.60	-10.19			
Bruno Perrodin	LO		630	0.93	-0.03			
Votes			67,773	100.00		67,057	100.00	
Valid votes			67,773	97.95	-0.15	67,057	96.57	+5.75
Blank votes			1,042	1.51	+0.09	1,825	2.63	-4.50
Null votes			378	0.55	+0.07	560	0.81	-1.24
Turnout			69,193	71.33	+22.26	69,442	71.57	+26.06
Abstentions			27,807	28.67	-22.26	27,582	28.43	-26.06
Registered voters			97,000			97,024		
Result			LR HOLD					

=== 2022 ===
Legislative Election 2022: Isère's 7th constituency
Party	Candidate	Votes	%	±%
LR (UDC)	Yannick Neuder	11,492	24.84	+2.23
RN	Alexandre Moulin-Comte	10,935	23.63	+1.02
PCF (NUPÉS)	Dominique Dichard	9,694	20.95	+3.68
LREM (Ensemble)	Pascale Pruvost	9,155	19.79	−14.38
REC	Hugo Gagnieu	1,879	4.06	N/A
DVE	Estelle Meillier	1,239	2.68	N/A
Others	N/A	1,877		
Turnout		46,271	49.07	+0.14
2nd round result
LR (UDC)	Yannick Neuder	23,678	59.59	+11.43
RN	Alexandre Moulin-Comte	16,055	40.41	N/A
Turnout		39,733	45.51	+3.33
LR gain from LREM				

=== 2017 ===
Candidate	Label	First round		Second round	
Candidate	Label	Votes	%	Votes	%
Monique Limon	REM	15,050	34.17	17,716	51.84
Yannick Neuder	LR	9,958	22.61	16,456	48.16
Pierre Delacroix	FN	8,050	18.28		
Valérie Bono	FI	5,760	13.08		
Nadine Reux	ECO	1,847	4.19		
Zerrin Bataray	DVG	1,487	3.38		
Nadine Nicolas	DLF	1,158	2.63		
Bruno Perrodin	EXG	391	0.89		
Camélia Ghembaza	DIV	341	0.77		
Votes		44,042	100.00	34,172	100.00
Valid votes		44,042	97.89	34,172	88.60
Blank votes		718	1.60	3,359	8.71
Null votes		232	0.52	1,039	2.69
Turnout		44,992	49.21	38,570	42.18
Abstentions		46,430	50.79	52,877	57.82
Registered voters		91,422		91,447	
Source: Ministry of the Interior

=== 2012 ===
2012 legislative election in Isere's 7th constituency
Candidate	Party	First round		Second round	
Candidate	Party	Votes	%	Votes	%
Didier Rambaud	PS	18,087	34.83%	24,327	49.38%
Jean-Pierre Barbier	UMP	17,853	34.38%	24,942	50.62%
Robert Arlaud	FN	9,298	17.91%		
Patrick Bediat	FG	3,036	5.85%		
Myriam Laidouni-Denis	EELV	1,621	3.12%		
Gilbert Carle	MoDem	608	1.17%		
Bruno Lafeuille	DLR	386	0.74%		
Valérie Eynard	AEI	338	0.65%		
Marie-Line Goidin	??	300	0.58%		
Bruno Perrodin	LO	224	0.43%		
Arlette Tardy	NPA	171	0.33%		
Valid votes		51,922	98.75%	49,269	97.26%
Spoilt and null votes		657	1.25%	1,388	2.74%
Votes cast / turnout		52,579	60.01%	50,657	57.81%
Abstentions		35,034	39.99%	36,963	42.19%
Registered voters		87,613	100.00%	87,620	100.00%

=== 2007 ===
Legislative Election 2007: Isère's 7th constituency
Party	Candidate	Votes	%	±%
UMP	Georges Colombier	29,832	52.24	
PS	Elyette Croset-Bay	11,387	19.94	
MoDem	Lionel Lacassagne	4,004	7.01	
FN	Hugues Girard	2,888	5.06	
LV	Anne Fremaux	2,274	3.98	
PCF	Michèle Meffre	1,723	3.02	
Far left	Nadine Savio	1,334	2.34	
Others	N/A	3,667		
Turnout		57,986	57.88	
UMP hold				

=== 2002 ===
Legislative Election 2002: Isère's 7th constituency
Party	Candidate	Votes	%	±%
UMP	Georges Colombier	27,172	49.54	
LV	Christian Villard	10,991	20.04	
FN	Hugues Girard	8,148	14.86	
PRG	Miloud Sebeibit	2,314	4.22	
LCR	Alain Mathieu	1,273	2.32	
PR	Jean-Francois Lambert	1,098	2.00	
Others	N/A	3,851		
Turnout		56,126	63.48	
2nd round result
UMP	Georges Colombier	30,002	64.33	
LV	Christian Villard	16,637	35.67	
Turnout		48,333	54.67	
UMP gain from UDF				

=== 1997 ===
Legislative Election 1997: Isère's 7th constituency
Party	Candidate	Votes	%	±%
UDF	Georges Colombier	18,041	36.20	
FN	Eric Brunot	9,921	19.91	
LV	François Lienard	6,981	14.01	
PCF	Louise Carly	5,925	11.89	
LO	Bruno Perrodin	1,915	3.84	
DIV	Jean Belabre	1,720	3.45	
GE	Jean-Christophe Daudel	1,136	2.28	
DVD	Josiane Guinet	1,009	2.02	
Others	N/A	3,184		
Turnout		52,881	65.06	
2nd round result
UDF	Georges Colombier	32,375	74.11	
FN	Eric Brunot	11,313	25.89	
Turnout		52,004	63.98	
UDF hold				
