= Piezocera serraticollis =

Scientific classification
- Domain: Eukaryota
- Kingdom: Animalia
- Phylum: Arthropoda
- Class: Insecta
- Order: Coleoptera
- Suborder: Polyphaga
- Infraorder: Cucujiformia
- Family: Cerambycidae
- Genus: Piezocera
- Species: P. serraticollis

Binomial name
- Piezocera serraticollis Linell, 1897

Species of beetle

Piezocera serraticollis is a species of beetle in the family Cerambycidae. It was described by Linell in 1897.
