= Silas (name) =

- Pronunciation: /ˈsaɪləs/
- Gender: Male

Origin
- Origin: Latin
- Region of origin: Italia

Other names
- Related names: Sylvanus, Silvanus, Sylvain (French), Silvan (Dutch, German), Silvano (Italian)

Silas is a common given name and a lesser-known surname. It is a cognate of Silvanus.

== Etymology ==
The name comes from the early Christian disciple Silas. He is consistently called "Silas" in Acts, but the Latin Silvanus, which means "of the forest," is always used by Paul and in the First Epistle of Peter; it is likely that "Silvanus" is the Romanized version of the original "Silas," or that "Silas" is the Greek nickname for "Silvanus." It has been suggested that Silas is the Greek version of the Aramaic "Seila," a version of the Hebrew "Saul". The Latin name "Silvanus" may be derived from pre-Roman Italian languages.

== Variants ==
- Danish – Silas
- Dutch – Silas
- English – Silas, Sylas, Si, Sy
- French – Sylvain
- Indonesian – Silas, Silvanus
- German – Silas, Silvan
- Italian – Silvano

== People ==
=== Given name ===
- Silas, a 1st-century leading figure among the early Christian community in Jerusalem
- Silas (Portuguese footballer) (born 1976), real name Jorge Fernandes
- Silas Tertius Rand Bill (1842–1890), Canadian politician
- Silas Bolden (born 2001), American football player
- Silas Chou (born 1946), Hong Kong billionaire
- Silas Farley, American ballet dancer, choreographer and educator
- Silas Feitosa José De Souza (born 1985), Brazilian footballer
- Silas Deane (1738–1789), colonial American politician and diplomat
- Silas G. Harris (c. 1818–1851), American politician
- Silas M. Holmes (1816–1905), American politician
- Silas House (born 1971), American author
- Silas Huber (born 2005), Swiss footballer
- Silas Melson (born 1996), American basketball player
- Silas Weir Mitchell (disambiguation), multiple people
- Silas Katompa Mvumpa (born 1998), DR Congolese footballer
- Silas Parsons (c. 1800–1860), justice of the Supreme Court of Alabama
- Silas Wright Porter (1857–1937), American judge
- Silas Scarboro (1827–1907), American politician and physician from Maryland
- Silas Schwarz (born 1997), German footballer
- Silas Soule (1838–1865), American abolitionist who was murdered after whistleblowing
- Silas A. Wade (1797–1869), American politician
- Silas Walters (born 2002), American football player
- Silas Williams (1888–1944), American college football player and coach
- Silas J. Williams (died 1908), American politician from Ohio
- Silas, pen name of cartoonist Winsor McCay when working on the comic strip Dream of the Rarebit Fiend

=== Surname ===
- Eric Godwin Silas (1928–2018), Sri Lanka-born Indian marine biologist
- Mar Shila (Silas) (fl. 503–520), Catholicos Patriarch of the Church of the East
- Hayden Silas Anhedönia (born 1998), better known as Ethel Cain, American singer
- James Silas (born 1949), American basketball player
- Paul Silas (1943–2022), American professional basketball player and coach
- Paulo Silas (born 1965), Brazilian footballer
- Stephen Silas (born 1973), American professional basketball coach (Paul Silas' son)
- Xavier Silas (born 1988), American basketball player

== Fictional characters ==
- Silas Adams, henchman of Al Swearengen in the HBO series Deadwood
- King Silas Benjamin, played by Ian McShane from the American television series Kings
- Silas Blissett, in British TV soap Hollyoaks, played by Jeff Rawle
- Silas Dengdamor from season two of the BBC America television series Dirk Gently's Holistic Detective Agency
- Silas Botwin, in the Showtime series Weeds
- Sylas Briarwood, from the D&D livestream Critical Role
- Silas Crow (Ermineskin), in the movie Dance Me Outside based on the book of short stories of the same title by W.P. Kinsella
- Silas Greaves, bounty hunter and protagonist of Call of Juarez: Gunslinger
- Silas Greenback, primary antagonist in the British TV series Danger Mouse
- Silas Heap, in the Septimus Heap series by Angie Sage
- Silas Lynch, in the film The Birth of a Nation, played by George Siegmann
- The novel and character The Rise of Silas Lapham
- The book and character Silas Marner
- Silas Scratch, a fictional character and rumor from the children's novel Diary of a Wimpy Kid
- Silas P. Silas, played by Method Man in the stoner comedy How High
- Silas Stone, in DC comics
- Silas Thatcher, a supporting antagonist in the 2012 video game Assassin's Creed III
- Silas Vorez, antagonist in the video game The Quarry (video game)
- Silas Wegg, from Our Mutual Friend by Charles Dickens
- Silas and the Winterbottoms, a novel by Stephen M. Giles
- Silas, portrayed by Nicholas Hoult in the 2015 film Equals
- Sylas, a playable character from the Fire Emblem game series
- Silas, in American TV series The Walking Dead: World Beyond
- Silas, in the Brazilian Netflix series 3%
- Silas, in the novel The Da Vinci Code
- Silas, in the novel The Graveyard Book
- Silas, from the novels of Cecil Bødker, also adapted into a German TV series for ZDF in 1981
- Silas, in American TV series The Vampire Diaries
- Silas, (A.K.A. Colonel Leland Bishop), one of the antagonists from Transformers: Prime
- The novel and character Uncle Silas
- Silas Ramsbottom, character in Despicable Me 2
- Silas, character in Bloons TD 6
