= Sylvia Coleman =

American health journalist, author, speaker and expert in sexual abuse prevention

Sylvia Coleman is an American health journalist, author, speaker and expert in sexual abuse prevention.

== Early career ==
Coleman, originally a Boston native, relocated to Philadelphia to attend Temple University in Philadelphia (1995–1998). While there, she earned a bachelor's degree in journalism.

During her career, Coleman served as the coordinator for the Philadelphia and New Jersey editions of the Learning Key, a weekly educational supplement for The Philadelphia Tribune. Under her direction, the Learning Key received the National Newspaper Association Award for Best Youth Section in 2000. She later became an assistant editor and columnist at Advance Newsmagazines, where she launched the “Kaleidoscope” column, which focused on diversity and workplace inequities. The column won first place in the 2003 Merion Publications’ Writer's Excellence Awards, Editorial Division.

== Career highlights ==
Throughout her journalism career, Coleman interviewed many public figures such as Jill Scott, Jada Pinkett-Smith and Pennsylvania Governor Ed Rendell.

Coleman has also been featured on: NPR, "Wake Up Live" in Boston, Temple University, Praise 103.9, 107.9 WRNB and Borders Bookstore discussing sexual abuse.

== Awards ==
- 2007 Leeway Foundation Art & Change Grant
- 2003 Merion Publications’ Writers Excellence Awards: First Place, Editorial Division
- 2001 Merion Publications’ Writers Excellence Awards: First Place, Feature Division
- 2000 National Newspaper Association Award for Best Youth Section
- 1995 Golf Writer's Schripp Award in writing
- 1994 Mary Alice Rowdenhosier Award in writing
- 1994 Alan R. Yoffee Award in writing

== Speaker/Advocate ==
Coleman, a staunch advocate for sexual abuse survivors, taught the “From Victim to Victor” class for sexual abuse survivors with the Temple University PASCEP program in Philadelphia, Pennsylvania from 2003 to 2009. In 2008, with the help of a grant from the prestigious Leeway Foundation, Coleman created and launched: www.blacksurvivors.org, the nation's first official online support group and resource center for African-American sexual abuse survivors.

== Author ==
In 2008, Coleman published Creating a New Normal: Cleaning Up a Dysfunctional Life, a book that chronicles her recovery from sexual abuse, homelessness and severe depression.
