= Silvia Arrom =

American historian

Silvia Marina Arrom
- Born: August 26, 1949 (age 77); New Haven
- Occupations: Historian and Professor

Academic background
- Education: Bryn Mawr College; Stanford University

Academic work
- Discipline: Latin American social and legal history
- Institutions: Brandeis University

Silvia Marina Arrom (born 26 August 1949) is an American historian of Mexico. She is the Jane's Professor Emerita of Latin American Studies at Brandeis University.

Arrom has published on groups and issues that have largely been ignored in traditional accounts, including women, gender, the family, social welfare, popular politics, and the poor, with particular attention to the nineteenth century. She is known for her 1985 book, The Women of Mexico City, 1790–1857.

== Personal life ==
Arrom was born in 1949 to Cuban parents; Silvia (Ravelo) Arrom and José Juan Arrom, a distinguished professor of Latin American literature at Yale University. She grew up in New Haven, CT. In 1972, she married computer scientist David R. Oran. The couple has two children.

== Education ==
Arrom received her Bachelor's degree in Political Science from Bryn Mawr College in 1971. She then enrolled at Stanford University and earned her Master's and Doctoral degree in History in 1973 and 1978, respectively.

== Career ==
Arrom taught at Yale University and Indiana University before joining the faculty of Brandeis University in 1991 as the Jane's Professor of Latin American Studies. In addition to teaching in the History Department, she directed the program in Latin American and Latino Studies and was a member of the program in Women's, Gender, and Sexuality Studies. After becoming Professor Emerita in 2013, she continued lecturing, writing books, and collaborating with Mexican colleagues on research projects.

Arrom has received numerous fellowships to support her research and was a fellow at the Bunting Institute of Radcliffe College in 1991. She has served on editorial boards of scholarly journals, including the Latin American Research Review, Hispanic American Historical Review, Signs, Secuencia, and Estudios de Historia Moderna y Contemporánea de México. She served as president of the New England Council of Latin American Studies from 1996 to 1997, was the director of the Boston Area Consortium on Latin America from 1992 to 2010, and has been on the advisory board of the Asociación Latinoamericana e Ibérica de Historia Social (ALIHS) since 2019.

== Research ==
Arrom has published four monographs, three edited volumes, and numerous scholarly articles on Latin American social and legal history, especially of Mexico from 1770–1910.

Arrom's 1985 book The Women of Mexico City, examines women's legal status and the diversity of women's experiences by class, race, and marital status, and questions such stereotypes as the perpetual legal minority of women and their confinement to the domestic sphere. Her co-edited volume Riots in the Cities questions the view of urban politics as an exclusively elite affair before the 20th century.

Containing the Poor, which focuses on the inner workings of the Mexico City Poor House during the first century of its existence, demonstrates the failure of elite attempts to control the capital city's beggars. It also calls into question the utility of standard political markers and contrasting views of Liberals and Conservatives for institutional and social history. Arrom's 2017 book Volunteering for a Cause complicates the notion of the feminization of charity by exploring its gendered dimensions. By showing the resurgence of Catholic lay organizations and the limitations of public social welfare institutions, it also contradicts the dominant narrative of the decline of religion and the construction of a strong State during the Porfirian period. Her book La Güera Rodríguez focuses more squarely on the creation and persistence of historical fictions. Providing the first biography of an iconic Mexican woman, it also traces her subsequent journey from history to myth in the 20th and 21st centuries, thus highlighting the gap between history and popular memory.

In her interview with Hubonor Ayala Flores, Arrom described the stereotypes she challenges as "zombie theories" that are so ingrained that they refuse to die even in the face of contradictory evidence.

She was elected honorary president of the XVI Reunión Internacional de Historiadores de México (XVI International Reunion of Historians of Mexico), only the third woman to be so honored since the organization's founding in 1949.

== Awards/honors ==
- 1986 - Honorable Mention, Bolton Prize for best book in Latin American History, for Women of Mexico City
- 2001 - Honorable Mention, New England Council of LAS, Best Book in Latin American Studies for Containing the Poor
- 2022 - Honorary President, XVI Reunión Internacional de Historiadores de México
- 2023 - Howard L. Cline Memorial Prize for the best book in Mexican History for La Guera Rodriguez: The Life and Legends of a Mexican Independence Heroine, Latin American Studies Association

== Publications ==
=== Books ===
- La mujer mexicana ante el divorcio eclesiástico, (1800–1857). Mexico City: SepSetentas, 1976.
- The Women of Mexico City, 1790–1857. Stanford CA.: Stanford University Press, 1985. Spanish edition: Las mujeres de la ciudad de México, 1790–1857. Mexico City: Siglo XXI Editores.
- Containing the Poor: The Mexico City Poor House, 1774–1871. Durham NC: Duke University Press, 2000. Spanish edition: Para contener al pueblo: El Hospicio de Pobres de la ciudad de México, 1774–1871. Mexico City: CIESAS, 2011.
- Riots in the Cities: Popular Politics and the Urban Poor in Latin America, 1765–1910, co-edited with Servando Ortoll. Wilmington DE: Scholarly Resources, 1996. Spanish edition: Revuelta en las ciudades: políticas populares en América Latina. Mexico City: UAM-Iztapalapa/El Colegio de Sonora/Porrúa, 2004.
- De donde crecen las palmas, co-authored with José Juan Arrom and Judith A. Weiss. Havana: Centro de Investigación y Desarrollo de la Cultura Cubana Juan Marinello, 2005.
- Volunteering for a Cause: Gender, Faith, and Charity in Mexico from the Reform to the Revolution. Albuquerque: University of New Mexico Press, 2016. Spanish edition: Voluntarios por una causa: Género, fe y caridad en México desde la Reforma hasta la Revolución. Mexico City: CIESAS, 2017.
- La Güera Rodriguez: The Life and Legends of a Mexican Independence Heroine. Oakland: University of California Press, 2021. Spanish edition: La Güera Rodríguez: Mito y mujer. Mexico City: Editorial Turner de México, 2020.

=== Selected articles ===
- "Marriage Patterns in Mexico City, 1811," Journal of Family History 3, 4 (Winter 1978): 376-91.
- "Changes in Mexican Family Law in the Nineteenth Century: The Civil Codes of 1870 and 1884," Journal of Family History, 10, 3 (Fall 1985): 305-317.
- "Popular Politics in Mexico City: The Parián Riot, 1828," Hispanic American Historical Review, 68, 2 (May 1988): 245-268.
- "Historia de la mujer y de la familia latinoamericanas," Historia Mexicana 42, 2 (Oct.-Dec. 1992): 379-418.
- "Catholic Philanthropy and Civil Society: The Lay Volunteers of St. Vincent de Paul in Nineteenth-Century Mexico," 31-62 in Philanthropy and Social Change in Latin America, ed. Cynthia Sanborn and Felipe Portocarrero. Cambridge, MA: David Rockefeller Center Series on Latin American Studies, Harvard University, 2005.
- "Mexican Women Spearhead a Catholic Revival: The Ladies of Charity, 1863-1910," 50-77 In M. A. Nesvig, ed., Religious Culture in Modern Mexico (2007). Rowman & Littlefield Publishers.
- "La movilización de las mujeres católicas en Jalisco: Las Señoras de la Caridad, 1864-1913," 67-92 in Género en la encrucijada de la historia social y cultural de México, eds. Susie S. Porter and María Teresa Fernández Aceves. Zamora, Michoacán: Colegio de Michoacán/ CIESAS, 2015).
- "La Güera Rodríguez: la construcción de una leyenda," Historia Mexicana, no. 274 (Oct.-Dec. 2019): 471-510.
- "El papel de la mujer en el Virreinato, siglos XVI-XVIII," in México, 1521-1821. Se forja una nación. vol. 1, 513-529. Mexico City: Banamex, 2022.
