= Eemil Halonen =

Finnish sculptor

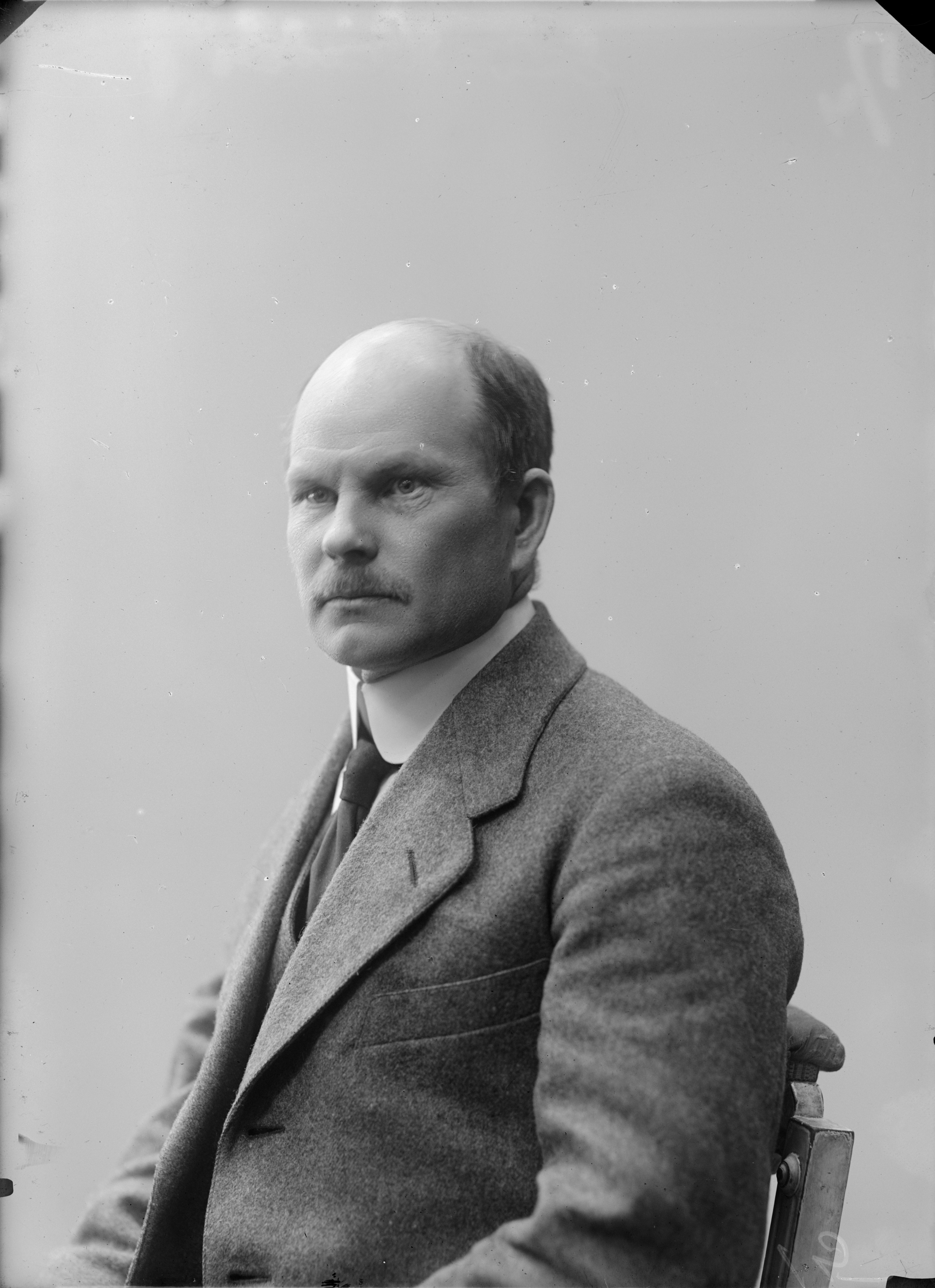
- Born: 21 May 1875; Lapinlahti
- Died: 5 November 1950 (aged 75)
- Occupation: sculptor

Eemil Halonen (21 May 1875 – 5 November 1950) was one of Finland’s most productive sculptors.

== Life ==
He was born in, Lapinlahti, and first studied woodworking at the Lappeenranta and Lapvesi Crafting School. Later he studied sculpture with Emil Wikström at the Finnish Art School. He travelled to study in Russia, France and Italy.

Eemil Halonen’s artwork was multifaceted. While living in Lapinlahti he sculpted images of the common people as well as public works, which he often made from Finnish wood and stone. After moving to Helsinki in 1919 Eemil Halonen concentrated on commissioned works, for example gravestones. His sculpture of Minna Canth, unveiled in Kuopio in 1937, is one of Halonen’s best known public pieces.

Eemil Halonen is one of the most notable interpreters of Finland’s national epic, the Kalevala. During his artistic career, which lasted more than 50 years, he repeatedly depicted subjects from the Kalevala. A central theme of his sculpture was women characters from the Kalevala, from Louhe to Sotkottaret. For Eemil Halonen the Kalevala was a sacred book that broadly affected his view of life. He would often say: ”The Kalevala has wisdom behind it”.

== Works ==
- Six decorative sculptures, Lallukka commercial building, Vyborg 1903-1904
- Aspen Girl, 1908
- Mother and children, granite, Finland-flash house Helsinki 1911
- Ernst Nevanlinna the tomb (Semper Excelsior) Hietaniemi Cemetery, Helsinki, 1934 (copies at the Turku cemetery and Mutton old cemetery)
- Statue of Minna Canth, Kuopio 1937
- Muuruvesi, Iisalmi, Kuopio and Hiitola hero statues
