= Silvi =

Silvi may refer to:

== People ==
=== Surname ===
- Lilia Silvi (1922–2013), Italian film actress
- Maurizio Silvi, Italian make-up artist

=== Given name ===
- Silvi Antarini (born 1984), Indonesian badminton player
- Silvi Jan (born 1973), Israeli football player
- Silvi Vrait (1951–2013), Estonian singer and music teacher

== Places ==
- Silvi, Abruzzo, Italy

== See also ==
- Sylvi, given name
