= Silvio Fernández =

Silvio Fernández may refer to:

- Silvio Fernández (fencer born 1946), Venezuelan fencer who competed at the 1968 Summer Olympics
- Silvio Fernández (footballer) (born 1974), Uruguayan footballer
- Silvio Fernández (fencer born 1979), Venezuelan fencer who competed at the 2004 and 2008 Summer Olympics
