= Silvia gens =

Ancient Roman family

The gens Silvia was a minor plebeian family at ancient Rome. According to legend, the Silvii were the royal dynasty of Alba Longa, Rome's mother city, and presumably came to Rome when that city was destroyed by Tullus Hostilius in the seventh century BC. Notwithstanding their connection with Rome's foundation myths, the Silvii were plebeians, and hardly any members of this gens played a significant role in history. However, from inscriptions, several Silvii appear to have had distinguished military careers, and Silvius Silvanus was governor of Moesia Inferior in the time of Diocletian.

== Origin ==
Both Livy and Dionysius of Halicarnassus (Note: Neither Livy nor Dionysius identify a specific source for their accounts of the Alban kings. Plutarch, who mentions but does not list them, attributes his knowledge of them to Quintus Fabius Pictor and his source, Diocles of Peparethus, both of whom wrote centuries earlier. Unfortunately, Diocles' works are entirely lost, and Fabius Pictor's history survives only in quotations by later writers.) relate the tradition that the Silvii were descended from Silvius, the second king of Alba Longa, who was so called because he was born in the woods. (Note: According to Livy, Silvius was the son of Ascanius, the founder and first king of Alba, and thus the grandson of Aeneas and Lavinia. Livy does not know the circumstances that caused Silvius to be born in the woods. Dionysius relates that Silvius was the son of Aeneas and Lavinia, and thus the half-brother of Ascanius, whom Dionysius makes the son of Aeneas by his first wife, Creüsa, and explains the circumstances of his birth thusly: after the death of Aeneas, Lavinia, who was then with child, was obliged to take shelter in the woods so that her stepson, who succeeded his father as King of the Latins, would not have her son put to death, as a threat to his power. Nevertheless, on the death of Ascanius, Silvius followed him on the throne—although according to Dionysius, only after the people of Alba chose him over Iulus, the son of Ascanius, whose descendants were the Julii. Diodorus Siculus provides the same account in Dionysius, with a few additional details, while Cassius Dio relates both versions. In Livy, Iulus was the son of Aeneas, but Livy is not certain whether Iulus and Ascanius were different persons, or which of them was the son of Lavinia. In this version, Ascanius was too young to rule when his father died, so Lavina ruled as regent, thus leaving the circumstances behind Silvius' birth—and name—unclear. Ovid, who lists the Alban kings in the Metamorphoses, mentions Iulus and Ascanius in separate passages, but does not address whether they were the same person, or how they were related to Silvius; but in his Fasti, Ovid says that Silvius was the son of Iulus, and that his original name was Postumus, with Silvius being given to him as a nickname, because he was born in the woods.) His descendants took the "cognomen" (Note: Literally, "surname", an "extra" name used to distinguish an individual or a related group of individuals. The Romans would have regarded Silvius as a nomen gentilicium, or "gentile name", inherited by everyone descended from the same family through the male line, reserving the word "cognomen" for additional names that might or might not be hereditary; but in this instance Livy uses the word to describe the original acquisition of the name at a period before gentilicia were in widespread use, which the Romans supposed occurred centuries later. Most of the other figures associated with Rome's foundation myths have only one name, until the time of Romulus; but everyone mentioned after the legendary founding of the city has a nomen gentilicium.) Silvius, which was then passed down to his descendants until the time of Numitor, the grandfather of Romulus and Remus. When Alba was destroyed by Tullus Hostilius, and its populus transferred to Rome, members of its leading families were enrolled in the Roman Senate, but the Silvii are not mentioned among them. Nowhere are Numitor's immediate successors named, nor is it stated whether they were descended from the Silvii; in the time of the war with Tullus Hostilius they were ruled by Gaius Cluilius, who died in the course of the war, and was replaced by a dictator, Mettius Fufetius. Unlike the Silvii, the Cluilii, presumably the royal house that succeeded them, (Note: Livy calls Cluilius the Alban king, although he then refers to him as their general; Dionysius describes both as military leaders, and says nothing about the Alban royal house after Numitor.) are included in the list of Alban families accorded senatorial rank.

== Praenomina ==
The main praenomina of the Silvii were Lucius, Gaius, and Quintus, which were among the most common names at all periods of Roman history. The inscriptions of this gens also afford examples of other common praenomina, including Marcus, Sextus, Publius, and Titus, as well as one instance of the rare praenomen Appius.

== Branches and cognomina ==
The nomenclature of Appius Silvius Junius Silanus would seem to indicate that he was a descendant of the noble house of the Junii Silani, though whether Silvius was his paternal nomen, or came in through his mother's side, is not readily apparent.

== Members ==
This list includes abbreviated praenomina. For an explanation of this practice, see filiation.

=== Legendary Silvii ===
- Silvius, the son, or brother, of Ascanius, was born in the woods, and raised by herdsmen in the mountains, according to Dionysius, who relates that he reigned for twenty-nine years. In Diodorus, he reigned for forty-nine years. In Ovid, his original name was Postumus, with Silvius being given him as an epithet.
- Aeneas Silvius, the first to affix his father's name, Silvius to his own, to distinguish himself from his ancestor, reigned thirty-one years, according to Dionysius, and thirty in Diodorus; he is omitted by Ovid.
- Latinus Silvius, established a number of colonies, later known as the Prisci Latini, or "Old Latins". (Note: Listed in Diodorus Siculus as Tibur, Praeneste, Gabii, Tusculum, Cora, Pometia, Lanuvium, Labici, Scaptia, Satricum, Aricia, Tenellae, Crustumerium, Caenina, Fregellae, Camerium, Medullia, and Boilum or Bola.) Dionysius assigns him a reign of fifty-one years, Diodorus fifty. The latter adds that he was a martial king, who founded colonies to repopulate the region that he had destroyed by war.
- Alba Silvius, reigned for thirty-nine years in Dionysius, thirty eight in Diodorus. He is omitted by Cassius Dio.
- Atys (Silvius), called Capetus by Dionysius, Epitus by Diodorus, and Epytus by Ovid, reigned twenty-six years.
- Capys Silvius, ruled over Alba for twenty-eight years.
- Capetus (Silvius), called Calpetus by Diodorus, and in the Fasti, reigned thirteen years. He is omitted by Cassius Dio.
- Tiberinus (Silvius), drowned in the river then known as the Albula, but subsequently called Tiber after him. Dionysius says that he reigned for eight years, and was slain in a battle near the Albula, his body being carried off by the river; Diodorus that he was swept away by the river while leading his army against the Etruscans.
- Agrippa (Silvius), assigned a reign of forty-one years. In the Fasti, he is the father of Remulus, but in Metamorphoses, Ovid calls him "Acrota", and makes him the younger brother of Remulus, fierce, but less rash.
- Romulus Silvius, struck by lightning. He is called Alladius by Dionysius, who makes him a terrible tyrant, contemptuous of the gods, who contrived to imitate thunder and lightning to intimidate his subjects; his death, after a reign of nineteen years, was thus an ironic punishment. Diodorus calls him Aramulius, and says that when thunder and lightning threatened the harvest, he bade his soldiers to beat upon their shields with their swords to drown out the noise, and thus he was struck down for his impiety. Ovid calls him Remulus, and mentions him rashly imitating lightning, but says nothing else of him except that he was killed by lightning, and succeeded by his younger brother. Cassius Dio relates his impiety, but says that he drowned when the Alban Lake overflowed. (Note: Here Cassius Dio may be confusing Romulus' downfall with a sudden flood of the Alban Lake that occurred without warning in 406 BC, perhaps due to the legend relating that the ruins of Romulus' palace were submerged in the lake.) Both Dionysius and Diodorus mention that the ruins of his house could be seen beneath the waters of the Alban Lake.
- Aventinus (Silvius), commemorated by a shrine on the Aventine Hill, reigned thirty-seven years. Diodorus relates that during a war, he and his army retreated to the Aventine as a redoubt. Cassius Dio states that he perished in war. Ovid describes the hill as his seat of power, and the site of his tomb—perhaps implying that he was slain there, during the war alluded to by Diodorus and Cassius Dio.
- Proca (Silvius), called Procas by Dionysius, and Palatinus by Ovid, ruled for twenty-three years, bequeathing his throne to his elder son, Numitor. Cassius Dio relates that in one account, Aventinus, not Proca, was the father of Numitor and Amulius. Ovid has Palatinus ruling from the Palatine Hill, as a parallel to his father, Aventinus.
- Numitor (Silvius), the elder son of Proca, was deposed and exiled by his younger brother, his sons killed, and his daughter made a Vestal Virgin.
- Amulius (Silvius), the younger son of Proca, deposed his brother, and attempted to extinguish his line; Dionysius relates that he ruled for forty-two years; Diodorus, forty-three.
- Aegestus (Silvius), the son of Numitor, according to Dionysius and Cassius Dio, was ambushed and slain while on a hunt arranged by his uncle, Amulius. In Ovid, his name is Lausus. Livy does not name Numitor's sons, but refers to them in the plural.
- Rhea Silvia, also called Ilia, the daughter of Numitor, was made a Vestal when her father was deposed; when violated, she gave birth to the twins Romulus and Remus, and named Mars as their father. Amulius threw her into prison, (Note: Lify says nothing further about her; Dionysius says that his sources vary as to whether Rhea was put to death, or saved by the intercession of her cousin, the daughter of Amulius, and kept in prison; and if the latter, whether she was still alive, and freed upon the death of Amulius.) and ordered the boys thrown into the Tiber.
- Antho (Silvia), the daughter of Amulius, pleaded with her father to spare the life of her cousin, Rhea Silvia. She is mentioned, but not named, by Dionysius, but named only in Plutarch.

=== Historical Silvii ===
- Silvia L. f. Apricula, buried at Casilinum in Campania during the first half of the first century, with a monument from her husband, Aulus Tatius Ampliatus.
- Appius Silvius Junius Silanus, named on a lead water pipe found at Rome.
- Silvius Vindilius, buried in a family sepulchre at Noreia in Noricum, dating to the first century, or the first half of the second, along with his wife, Secunda, and daughter, Silvia Vindilla.
- Silvia Vindilla, buried at Noreia, along with her parents, Silvius Vindilius and Secunda.
- Silvia Sex. s., a slave-woman belonging to Sextus Arellius Ursus, buried at Petelia in Bruttium, aged thirty, with a monument from Dionysius, her fellow slave, dating between AD 70 and 130.
- Silvia M. f. Severiana, made an offering to Jupiter Optimus Maximus at Anticaria in Hispania Baetica, dating to the first or second century.
- Aulus Silvius Divixto, buried at Burdigala in Gallia Aquitania, between the first and third centuries.
- Silvia T. f. Maternina, named in an inscription from Augusta Vindelicorum in Raetia, dating between the first and third centuries.
- Quintus Silvius Perennis, a tabellarius, or courier, from the lands of the Sequani, who made an offering to Jupiter Poeninus at Summus Poeninus in the Alpine province of Alpes Poeninae, at some point between the first and third centuries.
- Silvius, buried in a second-century tomb at Telesia in Samnium, aged nine years, ten months, and twenty-seven days, with a monument from his mother, Silvana.
- Marcus Silvius Sabinus, buried at Massilia in Gallia Narbonensis, in a second-century tomb dedicated by Silvius Sabinianus, probably his son.
- Silvius Sabinianus, dedicated a second-century tomb at Massilia to Marcus Silvius Sabinianus, probably his father.
- Quintus Silvius Speratus, centurion of the first cohort of Belgian soldiers, who made an offering to a local goddess at Brattia in Dalmatia, dating to the second century.
- Silvia Primigenia, buried at Rome in the latter half of the second century, aged forty-nine years, eight months, with a monument from her husband, Lucius Aurelius Fortunatus, a freedman of the emperor.
- Silvius Gentus, dedicated a tomb at Divodurum for his parents, Publius Silvius Gentus and Venustia Martia, dating to the second century, or the first half of the third.
- Publius Silvius Gentus, buried at Divodurum, along with his wife, Venustia Martia, in a tomb dedicated by their son, Silvius Gentus, dating to the second century, or the first half of the third.
- Albillius Silvius Albilli f., made an offering to the divine emperors found at modern Saint-Honoré-les-Bains, formerly part of Gallia Lugdunensis, dating between AD 150 and 300.
- Silvius Aestivus, buried at Doclea in Dalmatia between AD 150 and 300, in a tomb dedicated by his colleagues, Pompeius Julius Acedinus and Flavius Gierasimus.
- Lucius Silvius Victor, made an offering to Nehalennia at Ganventa in Gallia Belgica, dating between AD 150 and 250.
- Gaius Silvius Auspex, prefect of the second cohort of Tungrian soldiers, who made offerings to Mars, Minerva, Victoria, and Viridecthis at Blatobulgium in Britannia, dating between AD 158 and 161.
- Gaius Silvius Senecio, one of several individuals identified as platiodanni in an inscription from Mogontiacum in Germania Superior, dating between AD 170 and 230.
- Silvia, named in a votive inscription from the site of modern Blažuj, formerly part of Dalmatia, dating between AD 170 and 300.
- Silvius Candidus, the father of sixteen children, was granted a remittance from his civic obligations by Pertinax, that he might devote his time and resources to bringing up his family.
- Silvius Pat[...] Ursicinus, buried at the site of modern Castroverde de Cerrato, formerly part of Hispania Citerior, aged twenty-nine, between AD 201 and 235.
- Silvia Ursula, buried at Virunum in Noricum, aged forty, in a tomb dedicated by her husband, Publius Albius Calandinus, for himself and his wife, dating to the first half of the third century.
- Gaius Silvius Praeceptor, the father of Lucius Silvius, and grandfather of Lucius Silvius Italicus, who dedicated a third-century tomb at Gabuleum in Moesia Superior to his father.
- Lucius Silvius C. f., the son of Gaius Silvius Praeceptor, was buried in a third-century tomb at Gabuleum, dedicated by his son, Lucius Silvius Italicus, along with his wife, Andia.
- Lucius Silvius L. f. C. n. Italicus, dedicated a third-century tomb at Gabuleum to his parents, Lucius Silvius and Andia.
- Quintus Silvius Anatellon, a prefect in the fifth cohort of the vigiles at Rome in AD 210. Between 212 and 214 he was optio beneficarius, the chief lieutenant of Quintus Marcius Dioga, prefect of the vigiles at Ostia.
- Silvius Silvanus, governor of Moesia Inferior under Diocletian, made an offering to Jupiter Optimus Maximus and Juno Regina at Durostorum.
- Silvius, buried in a fourth-century tomb at Rome, along with his wife, Fortunula, the daughter of Ladicenus.
- Silvia, a woman of a senatorial family, was buried at Vienna in Gallia Narbonensis, on the seventh day before the Ides of March, in the thirty-ninth year after the consulship of Anicius Faustus Albinus Basilius (March 9, AD 579), at the age of seventy-eight. She had several sons serving in religious orders, one of whom, Celsus, predeceased her.
- Silvia, buried in a sixth-century tomb at Augusta Emerita in Lusitania, in the five hundred and ninety-second year of the colony, about AD 567.
- Silvia, the wife of Gordianus, and mother of Pope Gregory I, had a sister, Pateria.

=== Undated Silvii ===
- Silvia, buried at the present site of La Flamengrie, Nord, formerly part of Gallia Belgica, along with her husband, Caupius Virilis.
- Silvia, probably the wife of Martyrius, with whom she dedicated a tomb at Augusta Treverorum in Gallia Belgica for Galla, probably their daughter, aged ten years and thirty days.
- Silvia, buried at Vienna, aged four.
- Silvius, one of the magistrates of Olisipo in Lusitania.
- Gaius Silvius, a potter whose work is documented from various locations in Gallia Aquitania and Narbonensis.
- Gaius Silvius Annianus, perhaps the son of Silvia Calvina, was buried at the site of modern Miranda do Douro, formerly part of Hispania Citerior, with a monument from his grandfather, Silvius Calvus.
- Silvia Annula, buried at modern Miranda do Douro, aged seventy.
- Silvia Calvina, buried at modern Miranda do Douro, aged twenty-eight, along with Gaius Silvius Annianus, perhaps her son, with a monument from her father, Silvius Calvinus.
- Silvius Calvus, dedicated a monument at modern Miranda do Douro to his brother, Silvius Silvanus, and another to his daughter, Silvia Calvina, and grandson, Gaius Silvius Annianus.
- Quintus Silvius Felix, buried at Althiburos in Africa Proconsularis, aged thirteen years and five months.
- Lucius Silvius Paternus, dedicated a tomb at the modern site of Saint-Privat, Ardèche, formerly part of Gallia Narbonensis, to his wife of thirty-two years, whose name has not been preserved.
- Silvia Primigenia, along with her son, Tiberius Claudius Primigenius, dedicated a tomb at Philippopolis in Thracia to her other son, Tiberius Claudius Martialis.
- Silvius Silvanus, buried at modern Miranda do Douro, aged twenty-five, with a monument from his brother, Silvius Calvus.
- Sextus Silvius Silvester Iccianus, made an offering to Mercury at Vasio in Gallia Narbonensis.
- Silvius Spartus, made an offering to Sucellus at Augusta Raurica in Germania Superior.
- Silvius Stephanus, buried at Rome, in a tomb dedicated by the actor Theseus.

== See also ==
- List of Roman gentes
- Silvius Brabo

== Bibliography ==
- Diodorus Siculus, Bibliotheca Historica (Library of History).
- Dionysius of Halicarnassus, Romaike Archaiologia.
- Titus Livius (Livy), History of Rome.
- Publius Ovidius Naso (Ovid), Fasti, Metamorphoses.
- Lucius Mestrius Plutarchus (Plutarch), Lives of the Noble Greeks and Romans.
- Lucius Cassius Dio Cocceianus (Cassius Dio), Roman History.
- Digesta, or Pandectae (The Digest).
- Dictionary of Greek and Roman Biography and Mythology, William Smith, ed., Little, Brown and Company, Boston (1849).
- Theodor Mommsen et alii, Corpus Inscriptionum Latinarum (The Body of Latin Inscriptions, abbreviated CIL), Berlin-Brandenburgische Akademie der Wissenschaften (1853–present).
- Giovanni Battista de Rossi, Inscriptiones Christianae Urbis Romanae Septimo Saeculo Antiquiores (Christian Inscriptions from Rome of the First Seven Centuries, abbreviated ICUR), Vatican Library, Rome (1857–1861, 1888).
- René Cagnat et alii, L'Année épigraphique (The Year in Epigraphy, abbreviated AE), Presses Universitaires de France (1888–present).
- August Pauly, Georg Wissowa, et alii, Realencyclopädie der Classischen Altertumswissenschaft (Scientific Encyclopedia of the Knowledge of Classical Antiquities, abbreviated RE or PW), J. B. Metzler, Stuttgart (1894–1980).
- Paul von Rohden, Elimar Klebs, & Hermann Dessau, Prosopographia Imperii Romani (The Prosopography of the Roman Empire, abbreviated PIR), Berlin (1898).
- La Carte Archéologique de la Gaule (Archaeological Map of Gaul, abbreviated CAG), Académie des Inscriptions et Belles-Lettres (1931–present).
- Anna and Jaroslav Šašel, Inscriptiones Latinae quae in Iugoslavia inter annos MCMXL et MCMLX repertae et editae sunt (Inscriptions from Yugoslavia Found and Published between 1940 and 1960, abbreviated ILJug), Ljubljana (1963–1986).
- José Vives, Inscripciones latinas de la España romana (Latin Inscriptions from Roman Spain, abbreviated ILER), Barcelona (1971–1972).
- A. H. M. Jones & J. R. Martindale, The Prosopography of the Later Roman Empire (abbreviated PLRE), Cambridge University Press (1971–1992).
- Hispania Epigraphica (Epigraphy of Spain, abbreviated HEp), Madrid (1989–present).
- Salmedin Mesihović, Antiqui homines Bosnae (Ancient People of Bosnia, abbreviated AHB), Sarajevo (2011).
