= Sílvio (footballer, born 1965) =

Brazilian footballer

Personal information
- Full name: Sílvio Renato Nunes
- Date of birth: 1 September 1965 (age 61)
- Place of birth: Joinville, Brazil
- Height: 1.82 m (6 ft 0 in)
- Position: Goalkeeper

Youth career
- Joinville

Senior career*
Years	Team	Apps	(Gls)
1985–1995	Joinville	204	(0)
1993	→ União São João (loan)		
1994	→ Santo André (loan)		
1995–2000	Grêmio	48	(0)
2001	Joinville		
2001	Santo Ângelo		
2002	Caxias-SC		
2003	Marcílio Dias		
2014	Fluminense-SC		
- * Club domestic league appearances and goals as of 30 November 2023

Sílvio Renato Nunes (born 1 September 1965), simply known as Sílvio, is a Brazilian former professional footballer who played as a goalkeeper.

== Career ==
Trained at Joinville, Silvio is the third goalkeeper with the most appearances for the club, totaling 204 in the period from 1985 to 1995, when he was state champion twice. He joined Grêmio in 1995 and even though he was Danrlei reserve most of the time, he participated in most of the club's achievements during the period. After failing in some games in 2000, he returned to Joiville in 2001, where he became state champion once again. He retired in 2003, but returned to football in 2014, as goalkeeper for Fluminense de Joinville. He is currently a goalkeeper coach for Joinville youth teams.

== Honours ==
Joinville

- Campeonato Catarinense: 1985, 1987, 2001

Grêmio

- Copa do Brasil: 1997
- Campeonato Brasileiro: 1996
- Campeonato Gaúcho: 1995, 1996, 1999
- Copa Sul: 1999
