= Silvia Ferrari =

American aerospace engineer

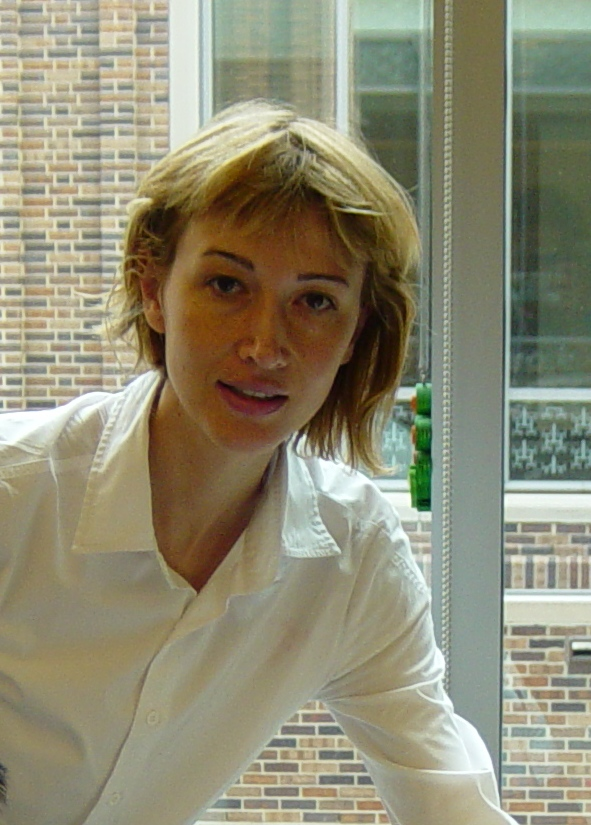
- Education: Embry–Riddle Aeronautical University (BS); Princeton University (PhD)
- Awards: Received Presidential Early Career Award for Scientists and Engineers (2005)
- Scientific career
- Workplaces: Cornell University
- Website: lisc.mae.cornell.edu

Silvia Ferrari is an Italian-American aerospace engineer. She is John Brancaccio Professor at the Sibley School of Mechanical and Aerospace Engineering at Cornell University and also the director of the Laboratory for Intelligent Systems and Control (LISC) at the same university.

== Education ==
Ferrari received her B.S. in Aerospace Engineering from Embry-Riddle Aeronautical University and earned her M.A. and Ph.D. degrees in Mechanical and Aerospace engineering from Princeton University.

== Research and career ==
Ferrari's research is primarily based on multi-scale adaptive sensor systems. Her research also includes online adaptive critic flight control, and simulations for the beech bonanza fly-by-wire test-bed. She wrote a book called Information-Driven planning and control along with the Thomas A. Wettergren regarding the performance modeling strategies.

Ferrari is currently the director of the laboratory for intelligent systems and controls. Prior to that, she was a professor of mechanical engineering at Duke University. She is the founder and director of NSF Integrative Graduate Education and research trainee-ship. Her teaching interests include optimal control theory, sensor networks, intelligent systems, feedback control of dynamic systems, and multivariable control. She will be the Institute Director for the Veho Institute for Vehicle Intelligence established at Cornell Tech.

Professor Ferrari’s research interests include Robotics, Theory of computation, Statistics and machine learning, systems and Networking, Neuroscience, Signal and Image Processing, Artificial Intelligence, Sensors and Actuators, Complex Systems, Remote Sensing, Algorithms, Nonlinear dynamics, Information theory, and communications.

== Research at Cornell ==
Prof. Silvia Ferrari moved to Cornell University and focused on the development of new mathematical models of learning and plasticity uncovered from biological brains, design, and analysis of methods and algorithms for computational intelligence and sensorimotor learning and control. She also developed new methods rooted in machine learning and systems theory to design intelligent autonomous systems that are able to learn and discover new information over time. Her Principal research efforts include the Intelligent systems for criminal profiling, approximate dynamic programming, learning in neural and Bayesian networks, reconfigurable control of aircraft, sensor path planning, and Integrated surveillance systems.

== Accomplishments ==
She worked on research projects like artificial brains and on the brains of moths with an aim to improve the drone flight for which she has been awarded grants of $2,587,875 and $400,000 respectively. She was also a part of Developing new programming that will make Robobees more autonomous and adaptable to complex environments and her research project on robots development and responding to human gestures. In an effort to win the Popular board game Clue, she along with her team developed a strategy and succeeded in doing so. she Co-led the launch of Veho institute for Vehicle Intelligence along with Cornell engineering.

== Awards ==
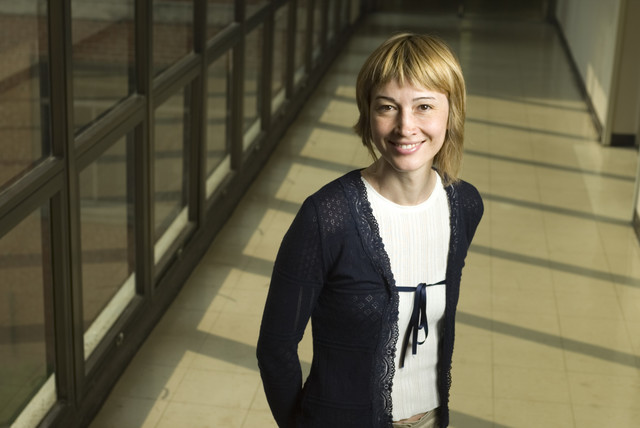
Silvia Ferrari

Ferrari was the recipient of the 2005 Presidential Early Career Award for Scientists and Engineers by the National Science Foundation. Additional awards include the Office of Naval Research Young Investigator Award, international crime analysis association research award, and National Science Foundation Career award. She is a senior member of the IEEE and a past American Society of Mechanical Engineer (ASME) Graduate Teaching Fellow.

== TED Talks ==
She gave a TED talk regarding the new generation of robots and what they can do. She also spoke about the instruments which are capable of unprecedented vision, hearing, Olfaction and about the active sensors. She also gave a speech on how aquatic mammals like dolphins and whales can communicate with each other underwater, and also about hyperspectral cameras object recognition and emotions of humans all the way from space. Other considerations have included how a hyperspectral camera can be used to monitor an industrial plant, what type of parameters robots use for perception, and should these robots perceive the world as humans do—or will humanity perhaps be better served by having a new and different perspective.

== Publications ==
- S. Ferrari, and R.F. Stengel. "Smooth function approximation using neural networks". IEEE Xplore.
- Silvia Ferrari and Robert F. Stengel. "Online Adaptive Critic Flight Control". Aerospace Research Central.
- Silvia Ferrari, Rafael Fierro, Brent Perteet, Chenghui CAI, and Kelli Baumgartner. "A Geometric Optimization Approach to Detecting and Intercepting Dynamic Targets Using a Mobile Sensor Network". Society for Industrial and Applied Mathematics.
- S. Ferrari, and A. Vaghi. "Demining sensor modeling and feature-level fusion by Bayesian networks". IEEE Xplore.
- Silvia Ferrari, and Mark Jensenius. "A Constrained Optimization Approach to Preserving Prior Knowledge during Incremental Training". IEEE Xplore.
