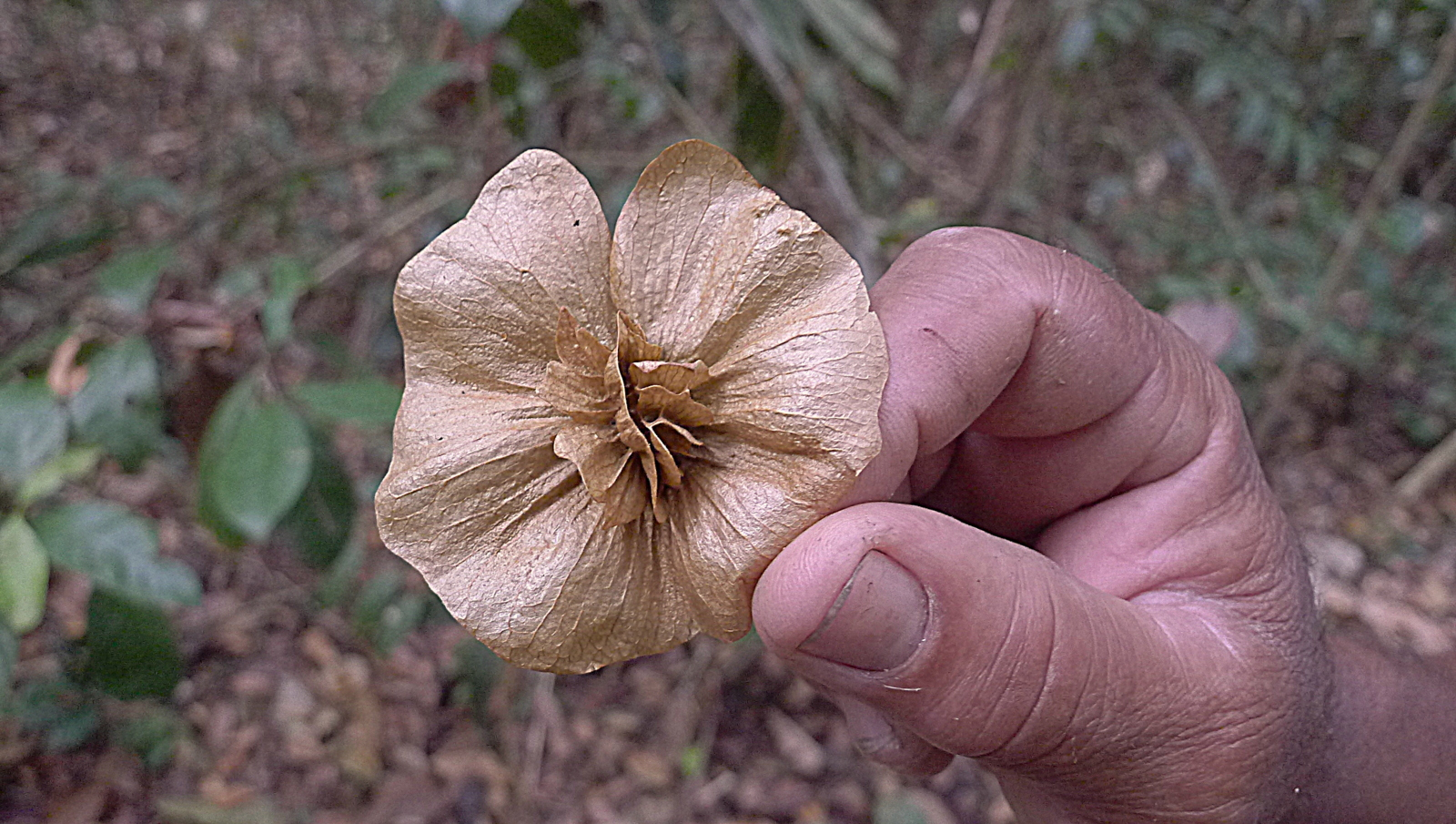
- Mezia sp., fruit

Scientific classification
- Kingdom: Plantae
- Clade: Tracheophytes
- Clade: Angiosperms
- Clade: Eudicots
- Clade: Rosids
- Order: Malpighiales
- Family: Malpighiaceae
- Genus: Mezia; Nied.

Species
- 10 species; see text

= Mezia =

Genus of flowering plants

Mezia is a genus in the Malpighiaceae, a family of about 75 genera of flowering plants in the order Malpighiales. Mezia comprises 10 species of woody vines and lianas native to South America, with one species (M. includens) extending into Panama.

== Species ==
- Mezia angelica W. R. Anderson
- Mezia araujoi Nied.
- Mezia beckii W. R. Anderson
- Mezia curranii W. R. Anderson
- Mezia huberi W. R. Anderson
- Mezia includens (Benth.) Cuatrec.
- Mezia mariposa W. R. Anderson
- Mezia rufa W. R. Anderson
- Mezia russellii W. R. Anderson
- Mezia tomentosa W. R. Anderson
