= Silvia Gosewinkel =

German politician (born 1986)

Member of the Landtag of North Rhine-Westphalia
- Incumbent
- Assumed office 1 June 2022
- Preceded by: Rüdiger Weiß
- Constituency: Unna III – Hamm II

Personal details
- Born: 24 March 1986 (age 40)
- Party: Social Democratic Party (since 2017)

Silvia Gosewinkel (born 24 March 1986) is a German politician serving as a member of the Landtag of North Rhine-Westphalia since 2022. From 2020 to 2022, she served as spokesperson of Jusos in Unna.
