= Silas Weir Mitchell =

Silas Weir Mitchell may refer to the following people:

- Silas Weir Mitchell (actor) (born 1969), American actor
- Silas Weir Mitchell (physician) (1829–1914), American surgeon
