= Sylvie Yvert =

French writer (born 1964)

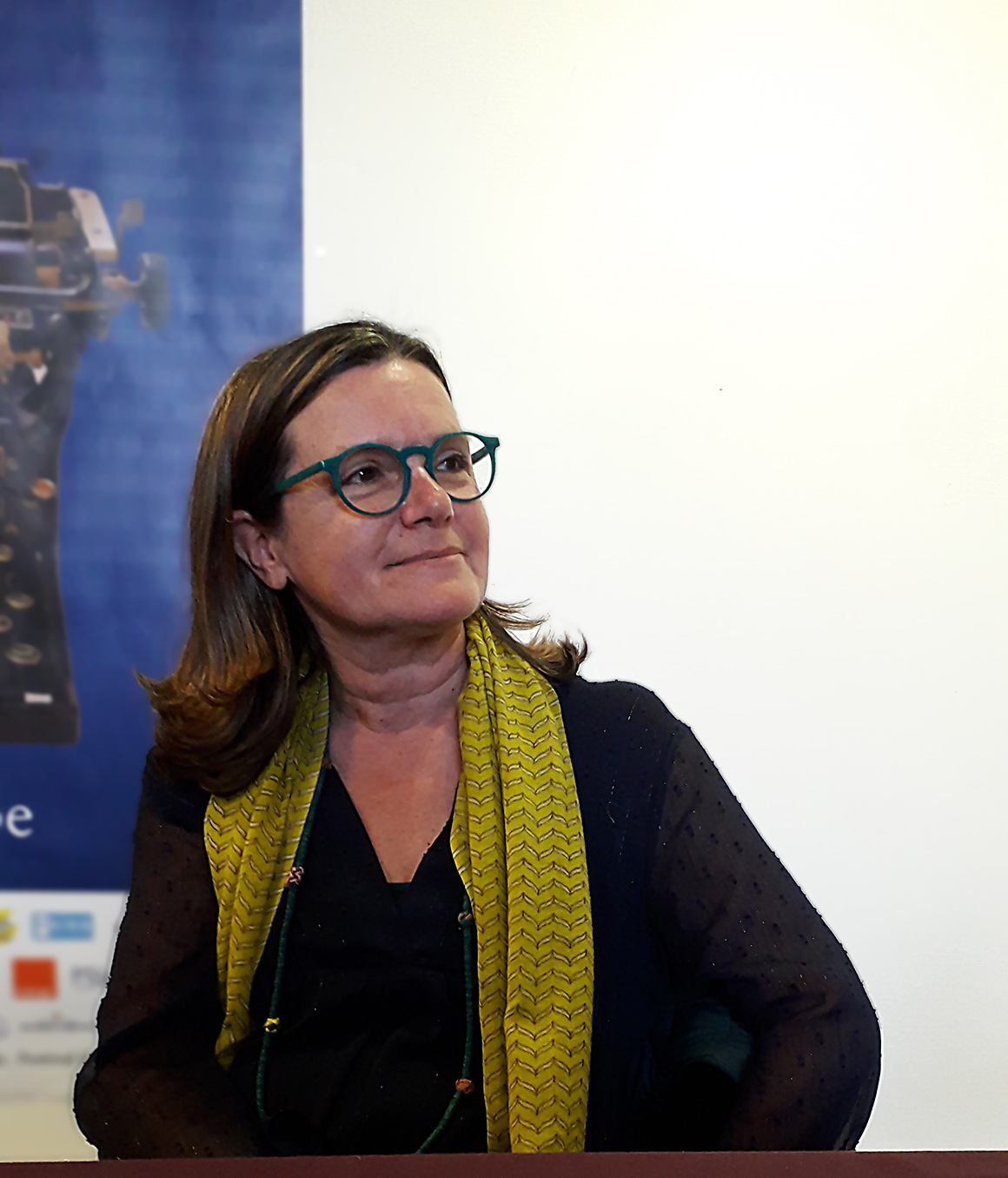
- Born: 1964 (age 61–62); Paris, France
- Occupation: Novelist

Sylvie Yvert (born 1964) is a French novelist and former project manager at the Quai d'Orsay in Paris.

== Biography ==
Born in Paris, Sylvie Yvert worked as a civil servant. She made her writing debut by publishing a collection of literary essays under the title Ceci n'est pas de la littérature... (This is not literature...) with Éditions du Rocher in 2008.

In 2016, Yvert's first historical novel was titled Mousseline la Sérieuse (Muslin the Serious), published in 2016 by Éditions Héloïse d'Ormesson. It told the fictionalized story of the life of Marie-Thérèse of France, the daughter of King Louis XVI and Marie-Antoinette of Austria. It was nominated for the L'Express-BFMTV Readers' Prize in 2016 and received the prix littéraire des Princes and the prix d’Histoire du Cercle de l’Union interalliée.

Her second novel, titled Une année folle (A Crazy Year) and published in 2019 was nominated for the Prix du Roman Historique Napoléon I, chaired by the Stéphane Bern and Jean Tulard. The two journalists created the prize that year to mark the 250th anniversary of the birth of the emperor Napoleon I. In it, she follows the itinerary of two Bonapartists during the Hundred Days period of the Napoleonic Wars in 1815.

== Television ==
In 2018, Yvert was a featured speaker in the show Secrets d'Histoire hosted by Stéphane Bern and dedicated to Marie-Thérèse of France, entitled Madame Royale, the Orphan of the Revolution, broadcast on 12 July 2018 on the television channel, France 2.

== Selected works ==
- This is not literature..., Paris, éditions du Rocher, 2008, 221 p. (ISBN 978-2-268-06477-2)
- Muslin the Serious, Paris, Héloïse d'Ormesson editions, 2016, 332 p. (ISBN 978-2-35087-346-6)
- A Crazy Year: novel, Paris, Héloïse d'Ormesson editions, 2019, 330 p. (ISBN 978-2-35087-490-6)
- At least the memory: novel, Paris, Héloïse d'Ormesson editions, 2021, 384 p. (ISBN 978-2-35087-747-1)

== Distinctions ==
- 2016: Literary Prize of the Princes of the magazine Point de vue
- 2016: History Prize of the New Union Circle
- 2019: Napoleon I Literary Prize from the Imperial Cities network
