= Sílvio (footballer, born October 1988) =

Brazilian footballer

Personal information
- Full name: Sílvio Silas da Silva Walenga
- Date of birth: 11 October 1988 (age 38)
- Place of birth: Ponta Grossa, Brazil
- Height: 1.97 m (6 ft 5 1/2 in)
- Position: Goalkeeper

Team information
- Current team: Cianorte

Youth career
- PSTC
- 2004–2006: Cianorte

Senior career*
Years	Team	Apps	(Gls)
2006–2009	Cianorte		
2009–2010	Internacional	0	(0)
2011	Atlético Paranaense	0	(0)
2011	América-RN	0	(0)
2012–2013	Operário Ferroviário	22	(0)
2013	Coritiba	0	(0)
2013	→ Marcílio Dias (loan)	1	(0)
2013	América-RN	3	(0)
2014–2015	Chapecoense	1	(0)
2016	Operário Ferroviário	1	(0)
2017	Confiança	2	(0)
2018–	Cianorte	0	(0)
- * Club domestic league appearances and goals as of 25 February 2018

Sílvio Silas da Silva Walenga (born 11 October 1988), simply known as Sílvio, is a Brazilian footballer who plays for Cianorte as a goalkeeper.

== Club career ==
Born in Ponta Grossa, Sílvio graduated with Cianorte's youth system, making his senior debuts in 2006 and becoming a starter in 2008. On 12 June 2009 he signed for Internacional, but was only used in the club's B-team.

On 26 January 2011, after having a two-week trial at Chelsea, Sílvio joined Atlético Paranaense. After being released he moved to América-RN, but was only used as a backup.

On 12 February 2012 Sílvio returned to Paraná, signing a short-term deal with Operário Ferroviário. After impressing with the side in Campeonato Paranaense he joined Coritiba on 5 June of the following year, being immediately loaned to Marcílio Dias.

On 19 July 2013 Sílvio moved back to his former club América, making his professional debut on 10 September, starting in a 1–1 away draw against Icasa for the Série B championship. However, he was mainly used as a backup to Andrey, only appearing in three matches.

On 10 January 2014 Sílvio joined Chapecoense, newly promoted to Série A. He subsequently spent the whole campaign as a third-choice, behind Nivaldo and Danilo.

== Honours ==
Confiança

- Campeonato Sergipano: 2017
