= Silvia Marin =

Italian flamenco dancer

- Born: 1967 (age 58–59); Milan, Italy
- Occupations: Dancer, choreographer, director and founding of own flamenco company
- Dancing career
- Dances: Flamenco
- Website: http://www.silviamarin.com/

Silvia Marin (born 1967) is an Italian-born flamenco dancer who is best known for her work with her company called El Flamenco vive. She was born in Italy and was first exposed to flamenco dance when she was 20. This prompted her to move to Spain to study the art, and she has since worked on stage, television, film and other projects. She founded El Flamenco Vive in 1997 to promote the dance to children, especially Spanish children. The company has performed at major cultural festivals in Europe and other countries such as the Festival Internacional Cervantino in Mexico. Her work has been recognized with various awards including the Premio Cultural a la Didáctica from the XLVII Festival Internacional del Cante de las Minas and the Onoreflicenza di Cavaliere Dell’ Ordine della Stella della Solidarietá Italiana.

== Life and studies ==
Marin was born in 1967 in Milan, Italy. At the age of 20, she had her first contact with flamenco in her hometown, and fell in love with it. After finishing her degree in physical education at the Istituto Superiore di Educazione Fisica in Milan in 1991, she moved to Seville, Spain, although her parents were not enthusiastic about it. She began her flamenco studies at the Manolo Marín Academy in Seville, but soon after decided to move to the larger city of Madrid, and study at the Amor de Deios Centero for Flamenco Art under Maria Magdalena, La Tati, Manolete and Cristóbal Reyes among others.

Her flamenco studies extended from 1990 to 2007, initially working in a children's clothes store to pay for classes. In addition to flamenco classes she also has classes on the staging of opera pedagogically with American Mary Ruth McGinn at the Teatro Real de Madrid (2006), the teaching of singing to primary school children with Wolfgang Hartman, Mirari Pérez and Sofia López-Iboar in the Teatro Real de Madrid (2008), and clowning with Gabrial Chamé at the Laboratorio de Teatro William Layton (2010–2011). She continues to work with Chamé at the Estudio Corazza and at the Chamé & Gené Estudios Teatrales, giving classes in flamenco.

== Career ==
Marin has worked on tour, in film, television, as a dancer, choreographer, teacher and director. She has been a singing student of Rafael Jiménez “Falo.” In her later career, she turned mostly towards performing flamenco to children, using it as a teaching tool.

Her touring work includes performing the opera Carmen with the Antonio Vargas Flamenco Dance Theatre and the Companía de Tomás de Madrid group from 1992 to 2006, in countries such as Switzerland, Germany, Russia, Ukraine and the Baltic countries, as well as Spain. In 2002 she toured with the European Romani Symphony Orchestra of Schoumen in Spain and Bulgaria.

For about ten years, from 1995 to 2005, she also worked with informal staging in Spain called tablaos such as those in El Café de Chinitas, Casa Patas and El Corral de la Morería. She stated that this helped her to learn as well, observing how the other artists moved, did their hair, wear makeup, clap their hands and interact with other artists.

In 1997, she participated in several feature-length films: Alma Gitana by Chus Gutiérrez and Flamenco Women by Mike Figgis along with Sara Baras and Eva Yerbabuena, as well as a film with Jacques Weber in France. In 1995, she was the anchor of a program Flamenco con K for TeleK in Madrid and did the choreography for the television program Paco y Veva for TVE1 directed by José Pavón.

She has taught flamenco classes in Spain, France and Italy from 1996 to 2009, in institutions such as the Tretino Danza Estate (Tesero, Verona and Milan), Taiwan, China and Algeria with the Instituto Cervantes and SEACEX. From 2008 to 2009 she worked with the Fundación Antonio Gades to create teaching guides for works such as Carmen, Bodas de sangre and Fuenteovejuna. This collaboration also produced the video series Flamenca en el Aula.

Her awards include the Premio Cultural a la Didáctica from the XLVII Festival Internacional del Cante de las Minas (2007), the Onoreflicenza di Cavaliere Dell’ Ordine della Stella della Solidarietá Italiana from the president of the Republic of Italy (2008), the Premio Enrique Maya from the Comunidad de Madrid (2010) and the Premio Flamenco Hoy 2010 (2011) .

== El Flamenco Vive ==
In 1997, Marin founded the El Flamenco Vive Company, named after a flamenco shop opened in Madrid by enthusiasts. The company consists of four dancers, two men and two women, a percussionist, a guitarist and a singer, and is dedicated to promoting flamenco music and dance to children, especially Spanish children as part of their heritage. The shows are interdisciplinary and participatory, demonstrating various styles of flamenco. Children in the audience are given opportunities to participate and experience the rhythm, melodies and dance steps imitating what they see the performers do.

The company has performed at various large events such as the Festival Flamenco pa tós (2005–2008), Festival Suma Flamenca in Madrid (2006–2008), the Flamenco Biennale in Seville (2006), the Festival Internacional de Música y Danza Granada (2007), the Flamenco Festival of Nîmes (2008–2010), the Holland Flamenco Biennale (2008), the Circuito Abecedaria por Andalucia (2008), the Festival Madrid en Danza (2010) and the Rues du Monde La Villete, France (2011) and the Festival Internacional Cervantino (2014) . The group has been invited to perform the work El flamenco vive paras los niños in New York, Geneva and Beijing.

Productions that Marin has created with the group include Flamenco al Rojo Vivo (2001), El Flamenco vive con los niños (2003), Gesto y compás (2004), En el Flamenco también hay juguetes (2004), El Flamenco en Cuatro Estaciones (2006) and Con pasaporte Flamenco (2008). In 2003, she created her first interactive show, El Flamenco Cuatro Estaciones, which combines her experience as a teacher, dancer and TV host and invites the audience to participate. The work was created for children and involves seven artists (singers and dancers) which demonstrate the various flamenco styles. The work is divided into four parts, one to dramatize each season. El flamenco vive para los ninos is an adaptation of the DVD disk for the stage, and is a simple production, no sets, just five artists giving lessons. Along with interviews from known flamenco artists. The 2004 production En el Flamenco también hay juguetes added props.

In 2007 she released an instructional DVD for children called Flamenco para niños, produced by Gomaespuma .

In addition to performances, Marin and the company give workshops to children and adults. In 2010 she taught the course The language of flamenco and its application in primary school: music and dance with CRIF La Acacias in Madrid. In 2011, she taught flamenco in the classroom for teachers as part of the sixth Festival Suma Flamenca at the Conservatorio Profesional de Danza de Granada Reina Sofia.
