= Revel-Tourdan =

- Commune
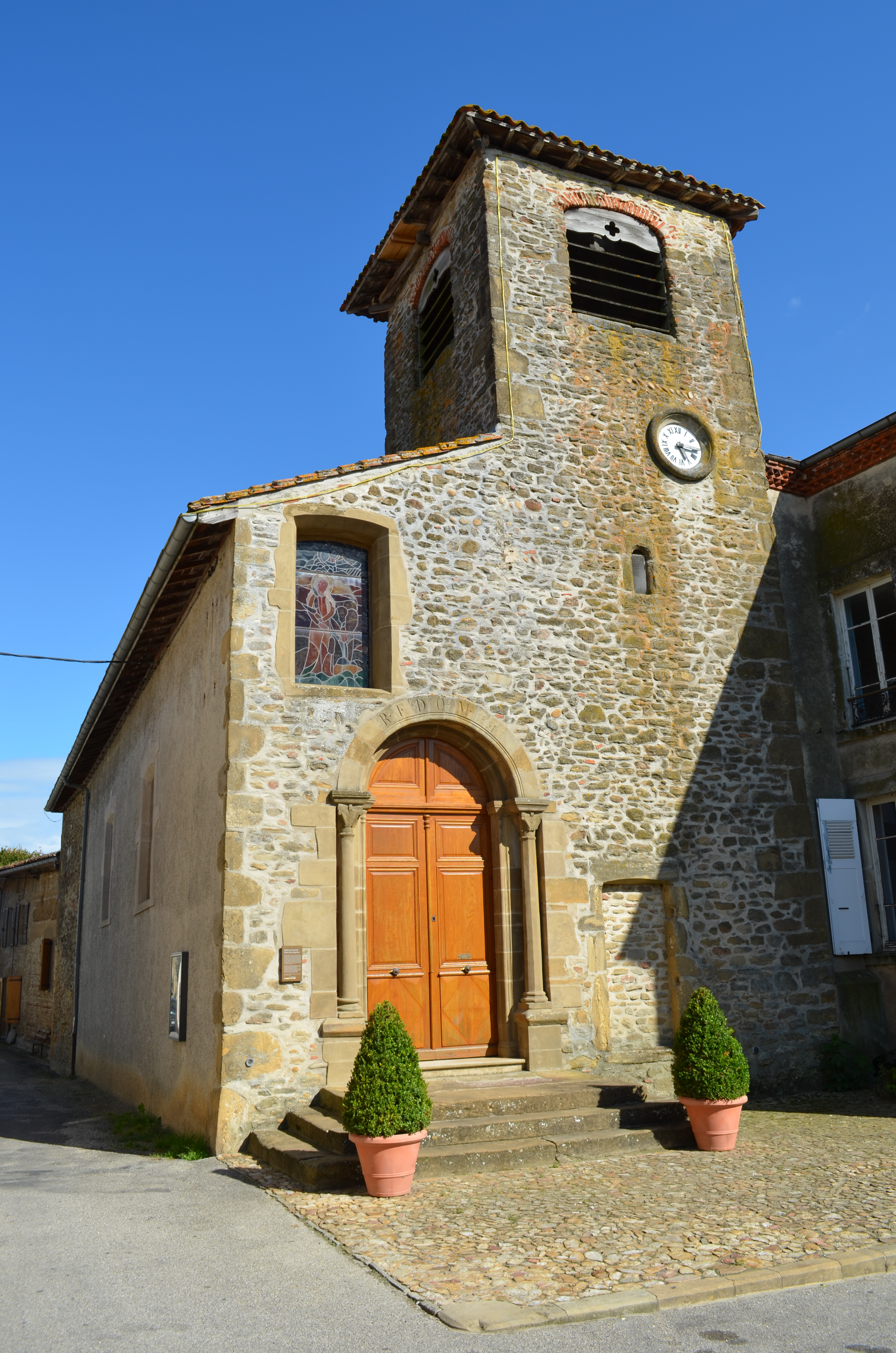
- The church of Revel
- Location of Revel-Tourdan
- Location within France Location within Auvergne-Rhône-Alpes
- Coordinates: 45°23′05″N 5°02′21″E
- Country: France
- Region: Auvergne-Rhône-Alpes
- Department: Isère
- Arrondissement: Vienne
- Canton: Roussillon
- Intercommunality: Entre Bièvre et Rhône

Government
  - Mayor (2020–2026): Yvan Argoud
- Area^{1}: 11.62 km^{2} (4.49 sq mi)
- Elevation: 480 m (1,570 ft)
- Highest elevation: 444 m (1,457 ft)
- Lowest elevation: 267 m (876 ft)
- Population (2023): 1,050
  - Density: 90.4/km^{2} (234/sq mi)
- Time zone: UTC+01:00 (CET)
  - Summer (DST): UTC+02:00 (CEST)
- INSEE/Postal code: 38335 /38270
- ^{1} French Land Register data, which excludes lakes, ponds, glaciers > 1 km^{2} (0.386 sq mi or 247 acres) and river estuaries.

Revel-Tourdan (French pronunciation: [ʁəvɛl tuʁdɑ̃]) is a commune in the Isère department in southeastern France. A Gallo-Roman silver situla from Tourdan is now in the British Museum's Collection.

== Population ==
Historical population
Year	Pop.	±% p.a.
1968	531	—
1975	549	+0.48%
1982	630	+1.99%
1990	794	+2.93%
1999	842	+0.65%
2007	963	+1.69%
2012	1,030	+1.35%
2017	1,053	+0.44%
2023	1,050	−0.05%
Source: INSEE

== Twin towns ==
Revel-Tourdan is twinned with:

- Sant Martí de Tous, Spain, since 1996

== See also ==
- Communes of the Isère department
