= Sylvie Robineau =

New Caledonian politician

Sylvie Robineau (born May 23, 1956, in Dakar) is a New Caledonian politician. She has served in the Congress of New Caledonia as a member of The Rally-UMP.
