= Sylvi Halinen =

Finnish farmer, agronomist and politician (1908–1995)

Anna Sylvi Pauliina Halinen (22 June 1908 – 16 August 1995) was a Finnish agronomist, farmer and politician, born in Mikkelin maalaiskunta. She was a member of the Parliament of Finland from 1954 to 1970, representing the Agrarian League, which changed its name to Centre Party in 1965. She was a presidential elector in the 1956, 1962 and 1968 presidential elections.
