= Agrichar =

Trademark for biochar aiding soil

Agrichar is the global brand name and US registered trademark for the biochar produced from the Pacific Pyrolysis proprietary slow pyrolysis process useful in biosequestration of atmospheric carbon dioxide, improving fertility of soils and reducing pressure on old growth forests. The trademark was originally held by BEST Energies until their Australian developed production technology and intellectual property was acquired by Pacific Pyrolysis.

== Agrichar development ==
The New South Wales Department of Primary Industries (NSW DPI) has been involved extensively with the agricultural testing and trials of Agrichar biochar and subsequent findings have received significant media attention as a result of BEST Energies and the NSW DPI being joint partners in winning the 2007 UN Association of Australia's World Environment Day award for 'meeting the greenhouse challenge'. Trials conducted by the NSW DPI using Agrichar biochar as a soil amendment have doubled and, in one case, tripled crop biomass yield when applied at the rate of 10 tonnes to the hectare.

== Biochar product differentiation ==
Significant product variations due to differing technology, process conditions, and feedstock compositions, require that care must be taken when comparing research between biochar products.

== See also ==
- Dark earth
- Terra preta
