= Billingsgate Roman House and Baths =

Archaeological site in London

Coordinates: 51.5093°N 0.0831°W

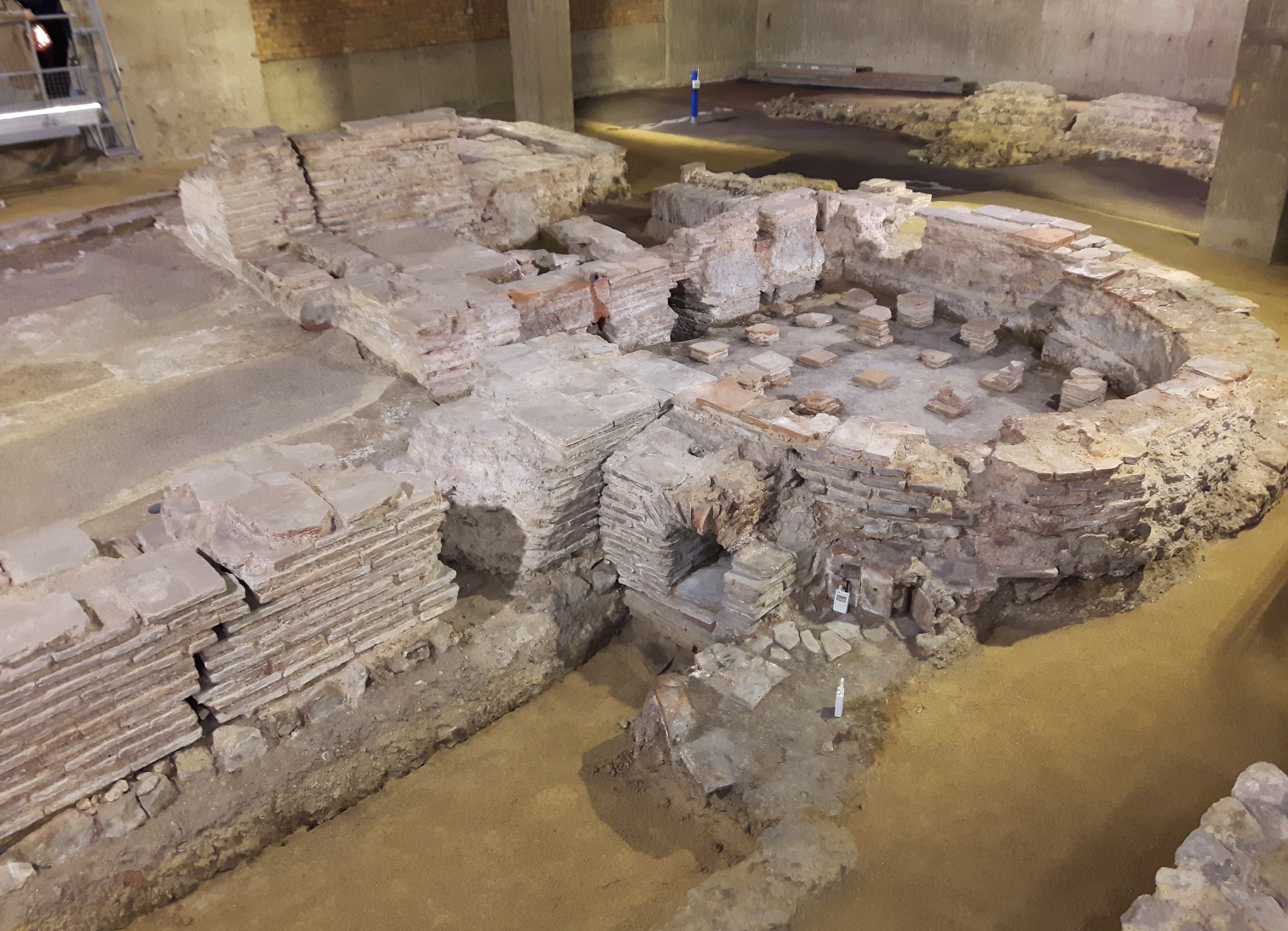
Billingsgate Roman Bath House

Billingsgate Roman House and Baths is an archaeological site in Londinium (Roman London). The best preserved parts of the house are a bath with hypocausts.

The ruins of the tepidarium were discovered in 1848 while the Coal Exchange was built on the site. Its preservation on the instruction of J. B. Brunning is the earliest example of in situ preservation in the City of London. The remains were preserved and were visible in the cellar of the building. In 1967 to 1970, the Coal Exchange was replaced by another building and the Lower Thames Street was enlarged. Further excavations were made at the site and the remains were incorporated into the cellar of the new building, but were not open to the public.

Pottery has shown that the Roman house was erected in the late 2nd century and had at this time a north and an east wing around a courtyard. There was most likely also a west wing but nothing of it survived. At this time the house was at the waterfront of the Thames. The rooms in the east wing had underfloor heating.

In the 3rd century a bath was added into the open courtyard in the middle of the complex. It had a cold room, a frigidarium (blue on the map) a warm room, (tepidarium - pink) and a hot room (caldarium - red on the map). The whole complex was in use till the beginning of the 5th century. Several hundred coins of the late 4th century were found at the excavations. This is of special importance as there is little known about the end of the Roman rule in Britain, and this house attests a large-scale building in use until the beginning of the 5th century. However, the house was most likely already in ruins by the year 500. An Anglo-Saxon brooch was found within fallen material from the roof.

== Gallery ==
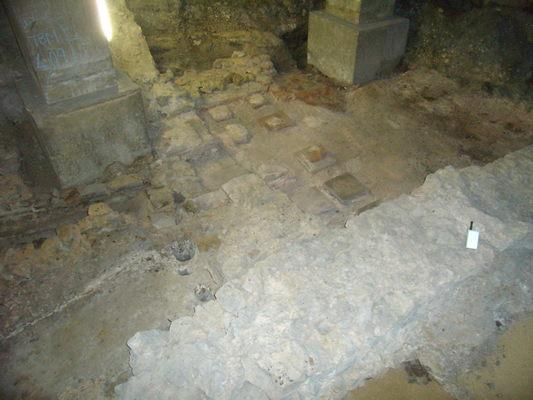
View on hypocaust

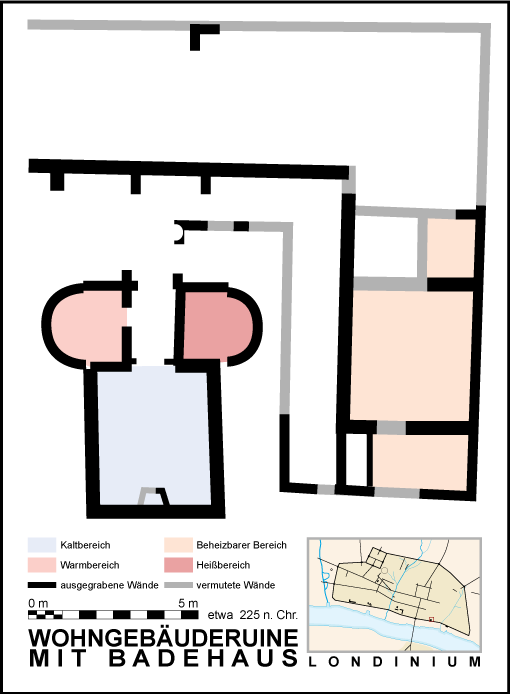
Plan of the remains of the Roman house at Billingsgate

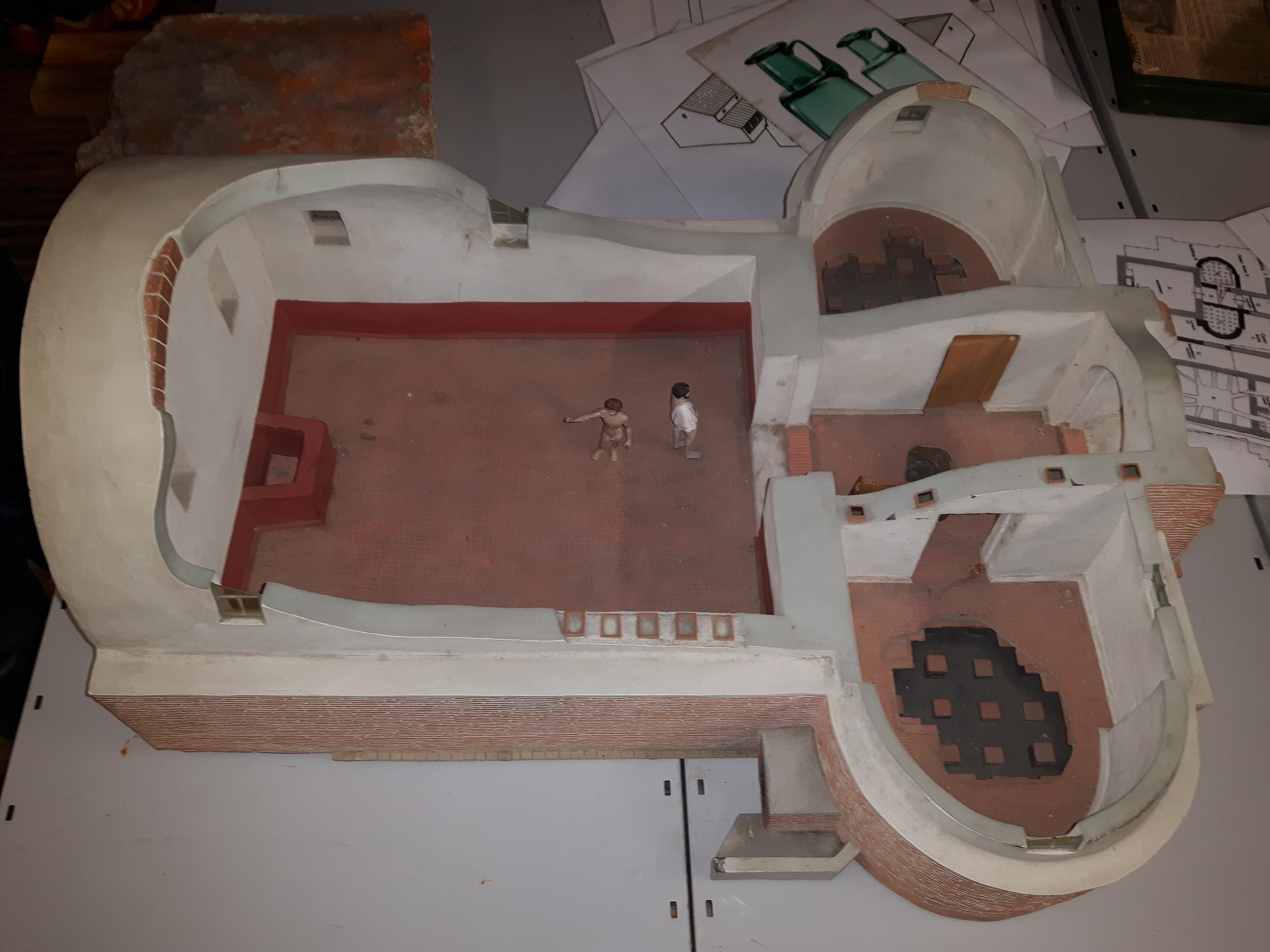
Model of Billingsgate Bath House

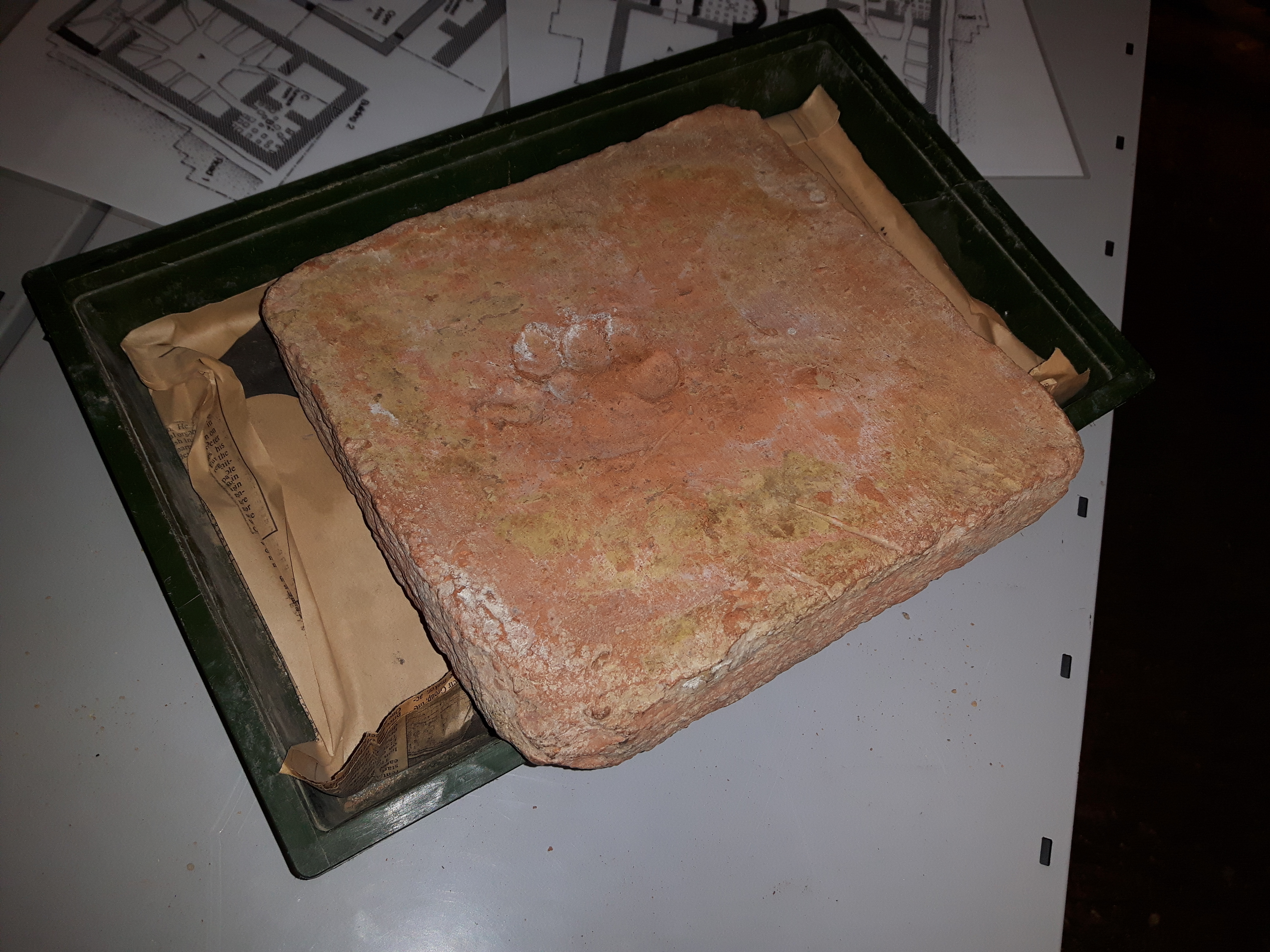
Pawprint on a Roman tile found at Billingsgate Bath House

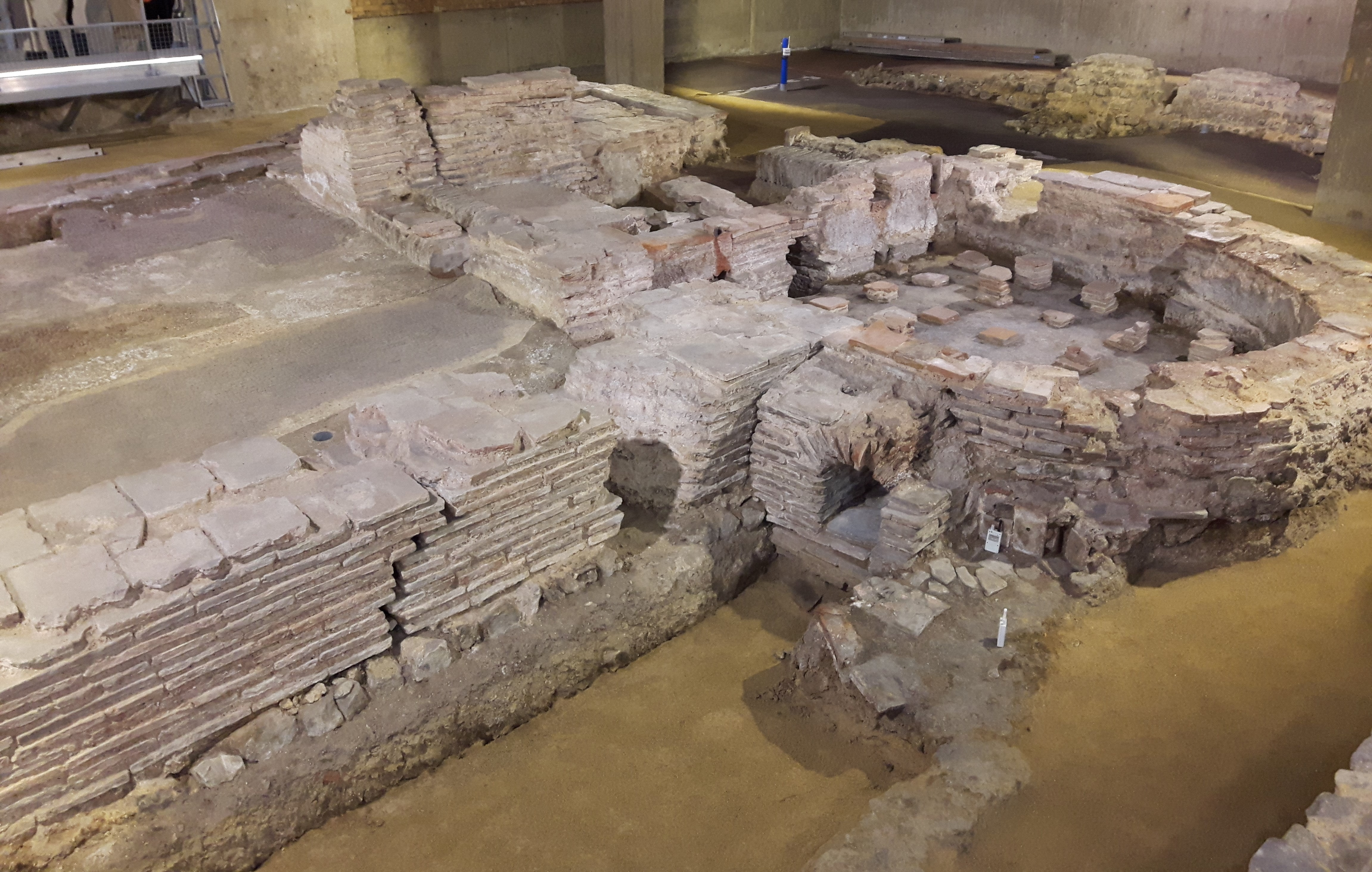

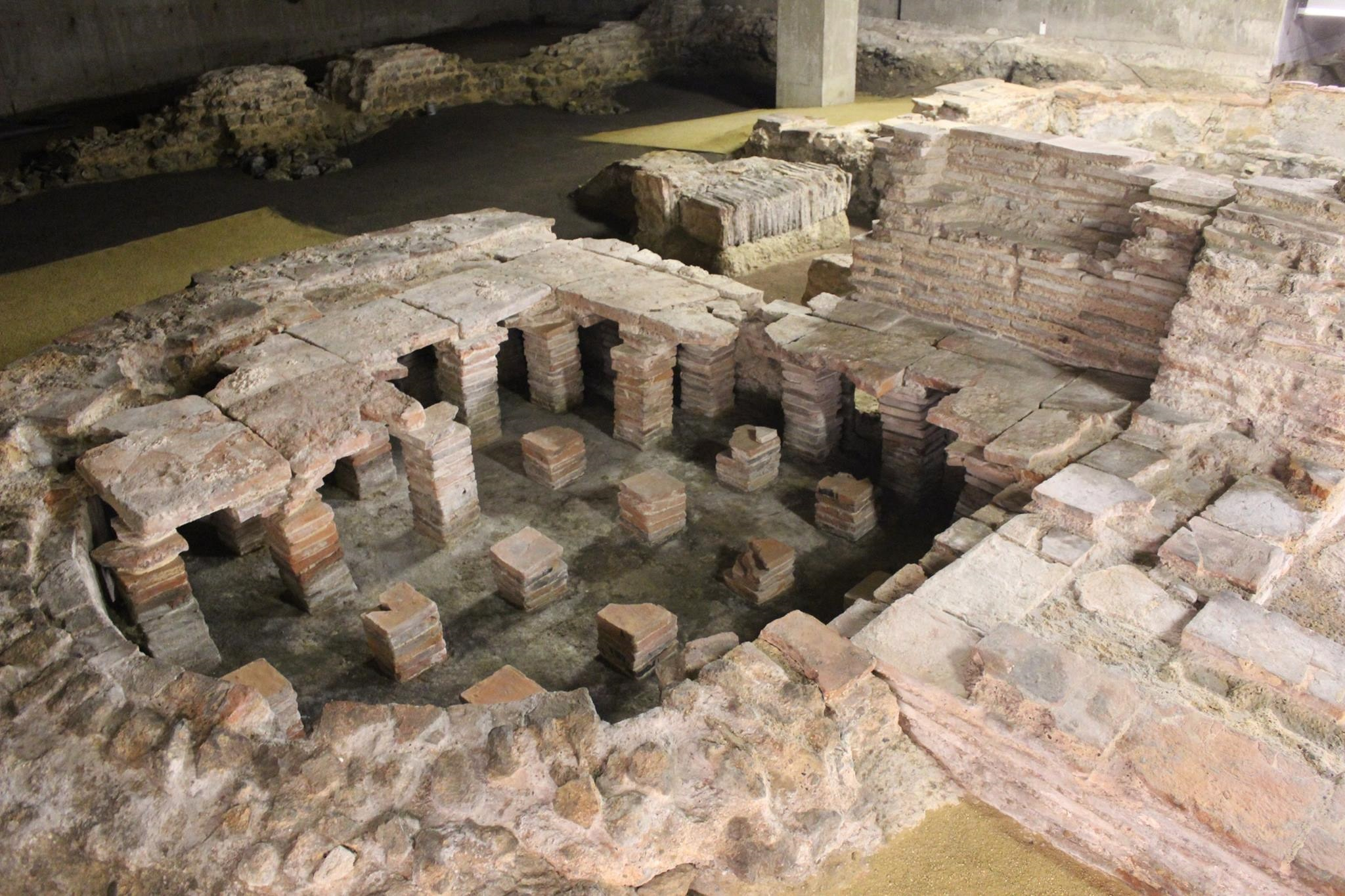

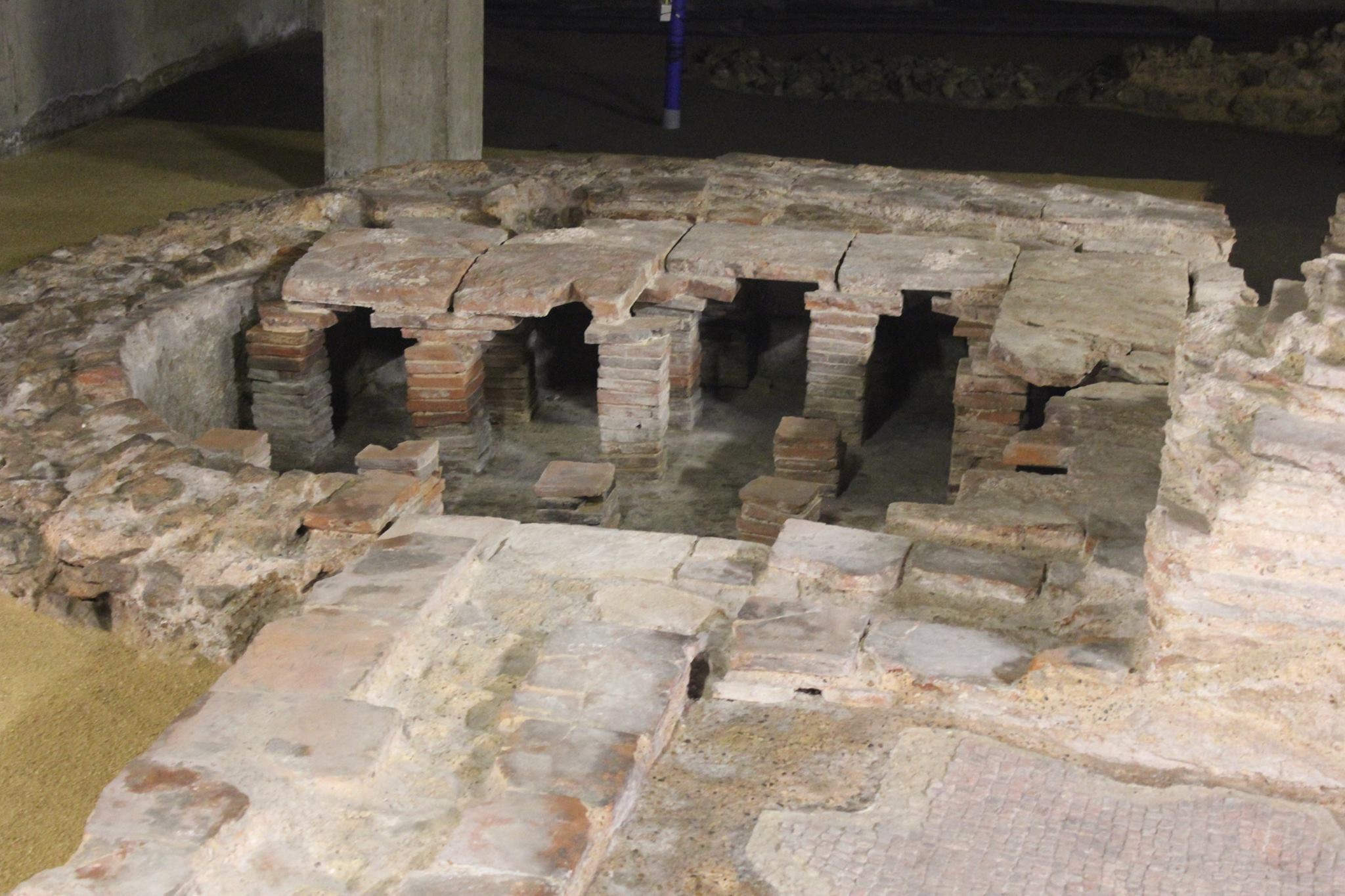

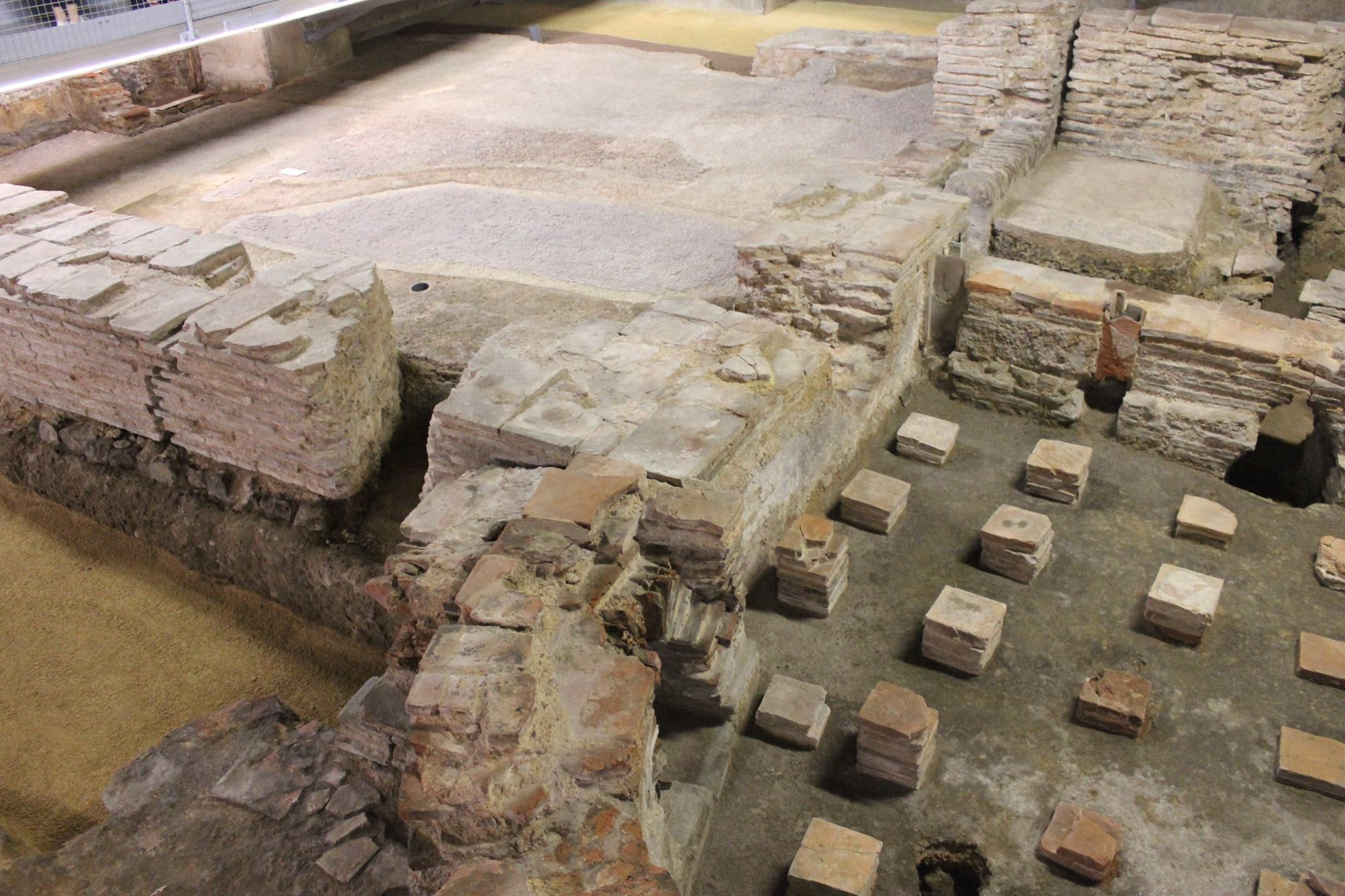

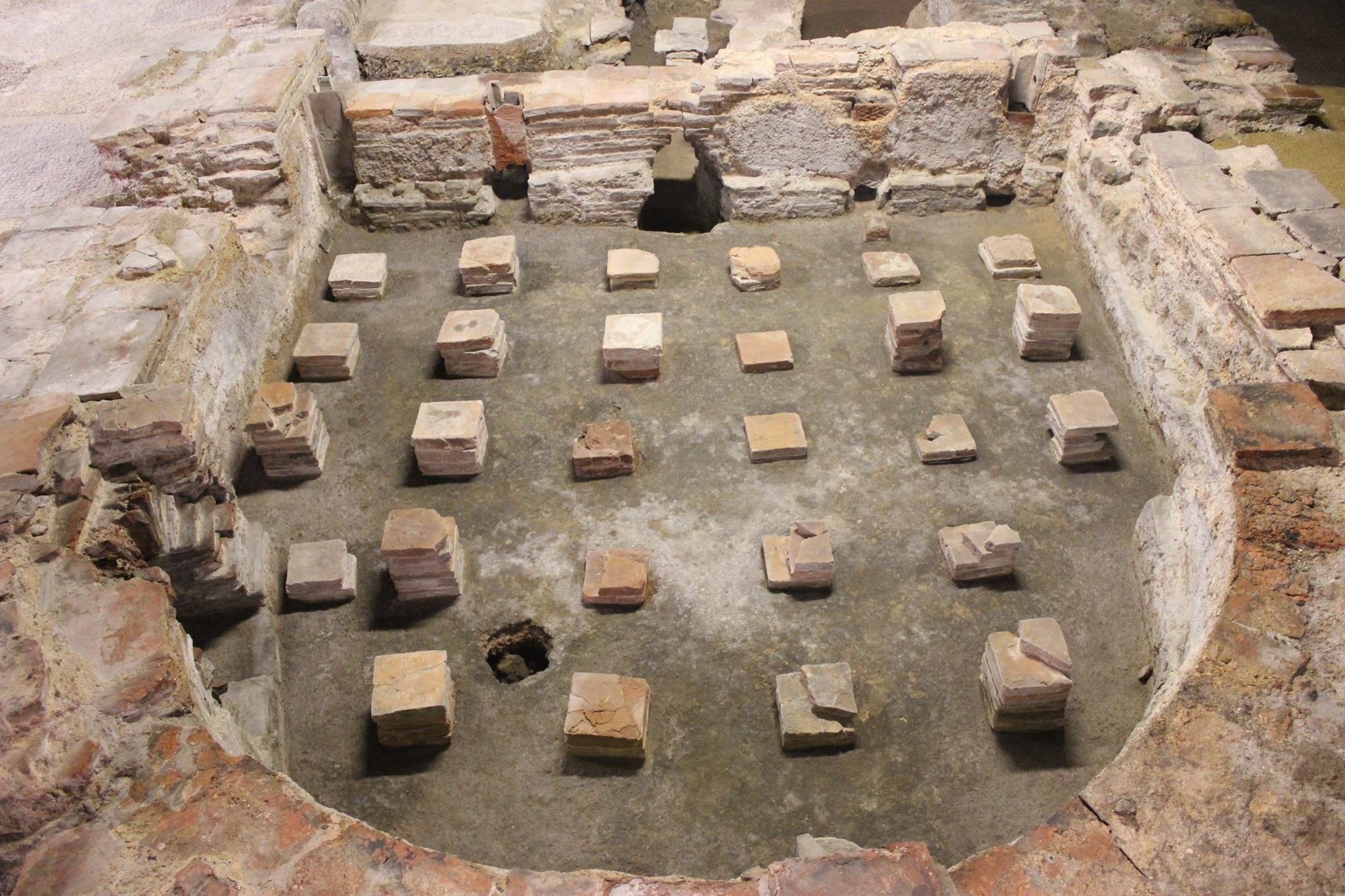

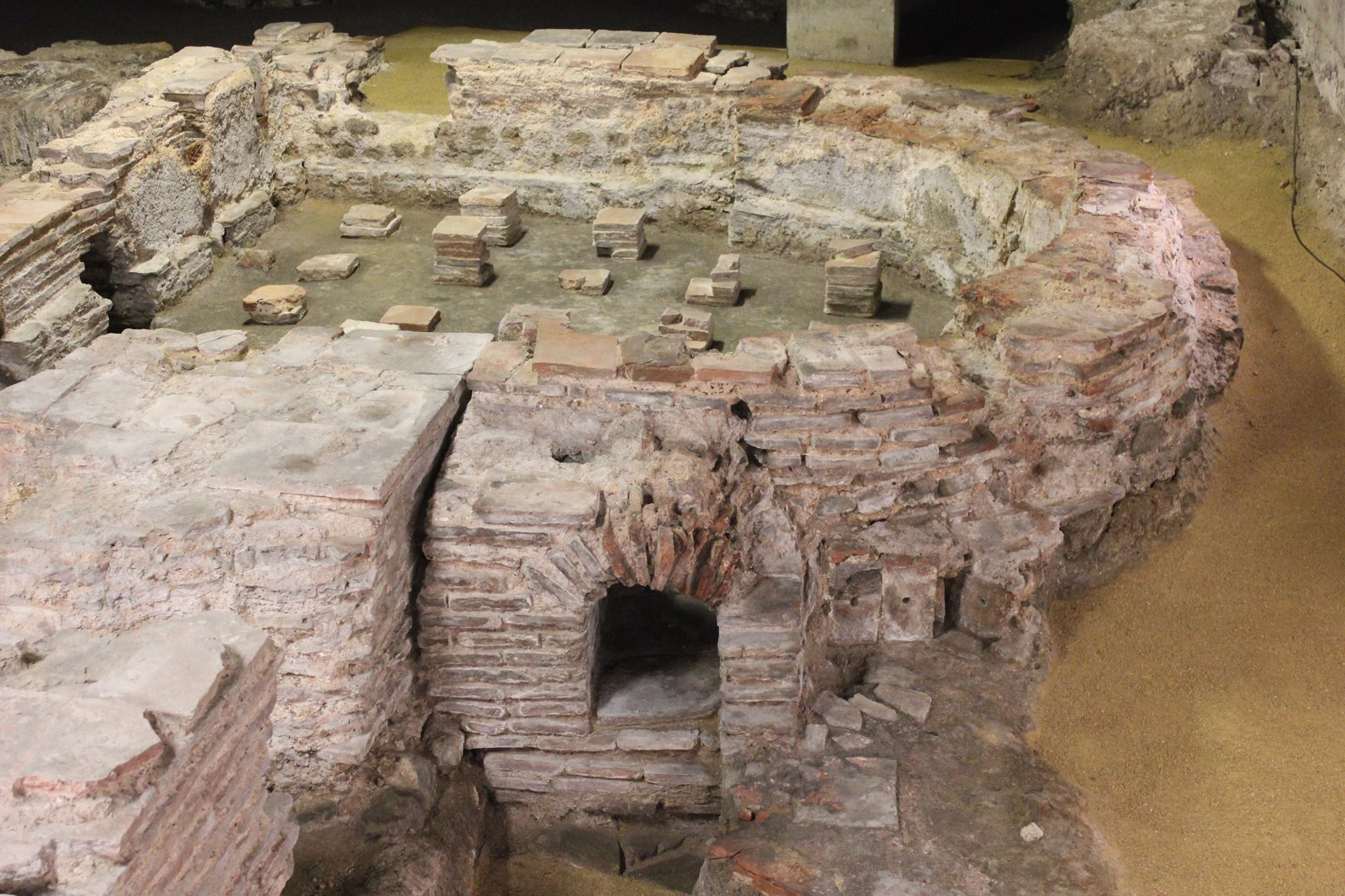

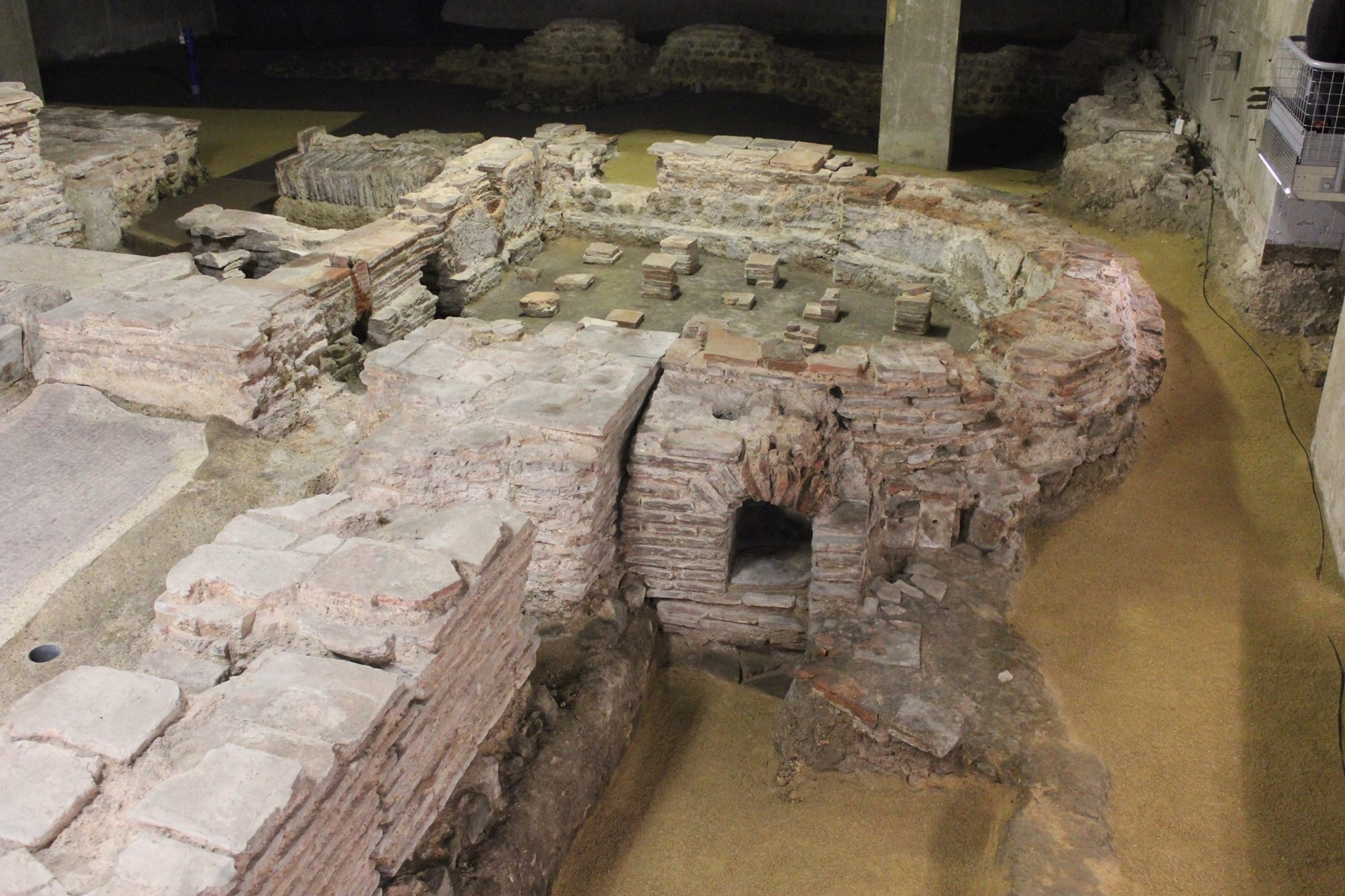

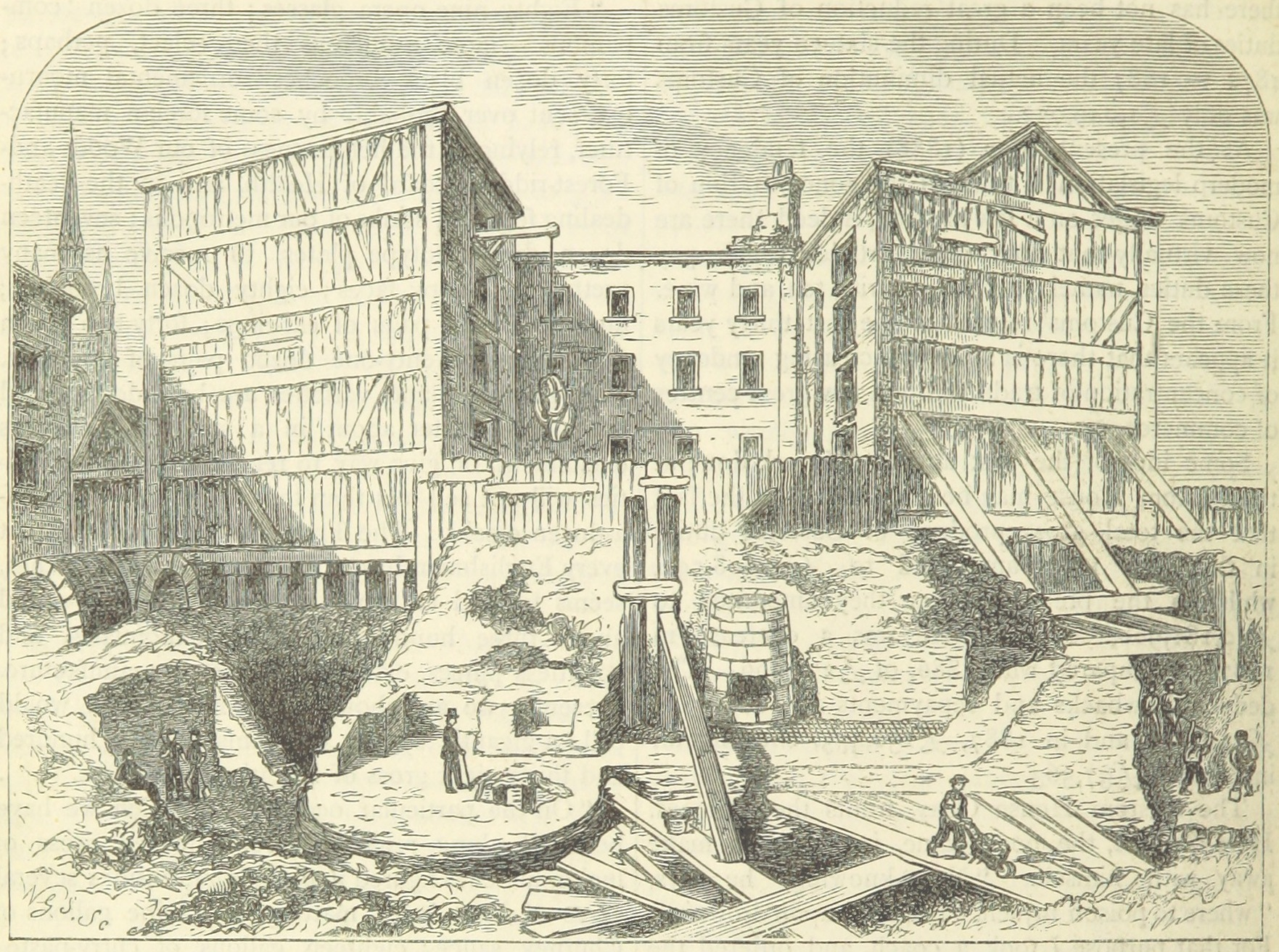
When first discovered in 1848, the builders of the New Coal Exchange preserved the remains in the basement, and provided viewing access
