= Marcus Martiannius Pulcher =

Governor of Roman Britain

Marcus Martiannius Pulcher was a governor of Roman Britain, most likely Britannia Superior, probably some time during the third century AD.

The only evidence of his work is an inscription which was found in 1975, re-used as part of the fourth century riverside defences in London. It states that he repaired the temple of Isis which had collapsed through old age. Peter Salway infers from this that his rule was relatively peaceful as he was able to undertake restoration work in the city.

Anthony Birley comments that Martiannius, his "remarkable nomen appears to be unique", although it is "a well-known type, formed from a cognomen, in this case Martianus." This fabricated nomen provides one of the few clues of Pulcher's origin, being a type which was "particularly popular in the Celtic parts of the empire. Hence the balance of probability points to an origin in northern Italy, Gaul, or the Rhineland; indeed, Britain itself cannot be excluded."

There is only one clue as to the date of this inscription: the style v.c. leg. Augg. pro praet. which points to a joint reign of Emperors. Assuming Britannia Superior was a praetorian province, Birley notes Pulcher could have been governor some time in 198-209 or 211; otherwise, as a consular governor his possible dates would be 221–2, 235–8, and most of the period 238–60. Birley also notes that there are several rescripts preserved in the Codex Justinianus that could possibly addressed to him.
