= Dark earth =

Archaeological term

In geology and archaeology, dark earth is a substratum, up to 1 metre (3 ft 3 in) thick, that indicates settlement over long periods of time. The material is high in organic matter, including charcoal, which gives it its characteristic dark colour; it may also contain fragments of pottery, tile, animal bone and other artefacts. It is interpreted as soil enriched with the sooty remains of thatched roofs from houses without chimneys, with other waste materials. In some areas it appears to give the soil added fertility.

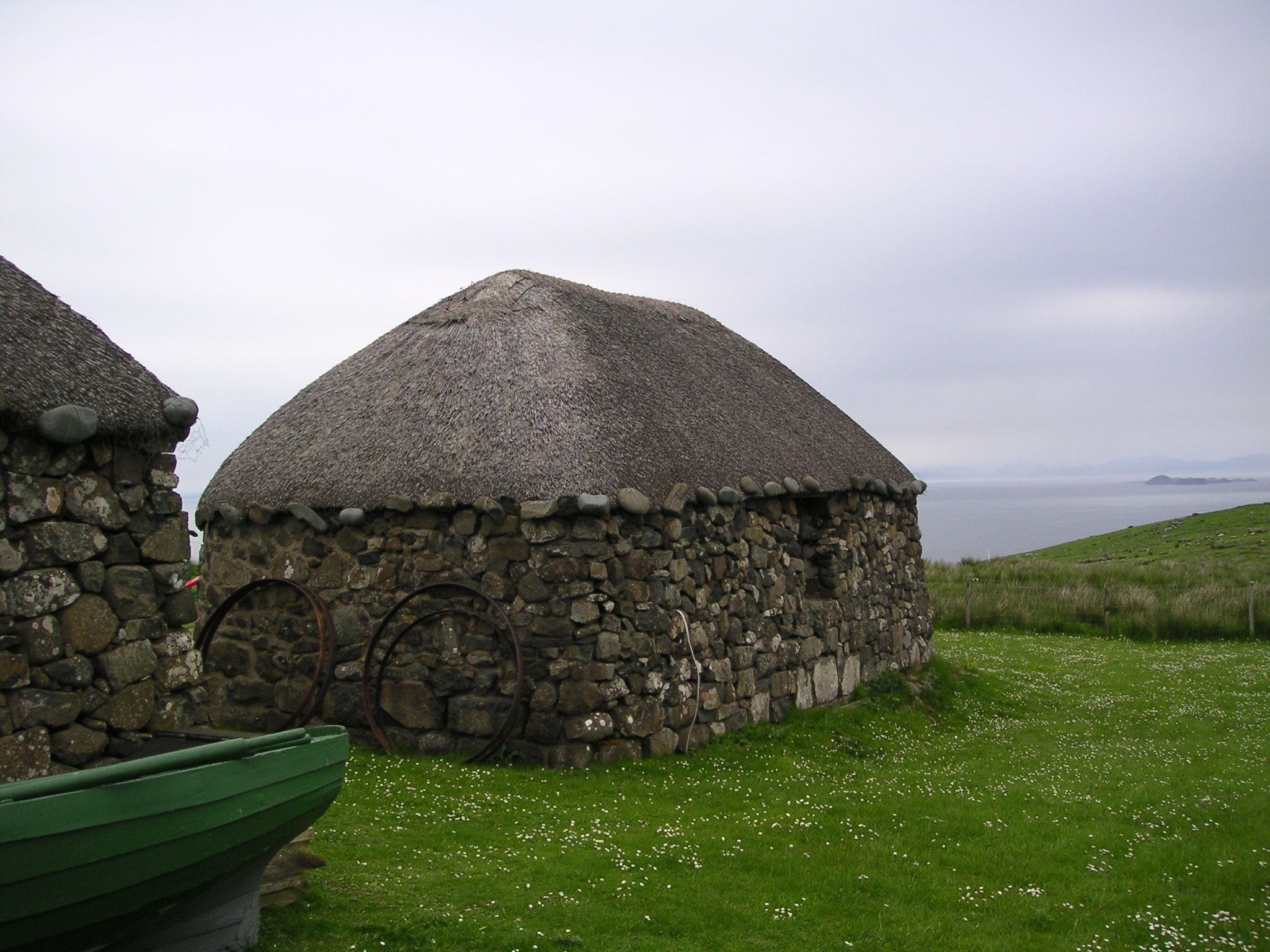
Restored blackhouse in a museum on Trotternish, Skye. There is no chimney on this house and the thatch becomes impregnated with soot. When the roof is replaced, the waste thatch can add fertility to the soil, resulting in dark earth.

London's dark earth was originally called 'black earth' by archaeologists. It was renamed 'dark earth' because of confusion with the chernozem (black earth soils in Russia), whose dark colour is traditionally (not universally) thought to come from humus, rather than soot.

== Charred material as agricultural improver ==
In the Hebrides, it was customary to remove the thatch from the "black houses" every spring, and spread it on the fields as fertilizer, improved by the soot which it retained. On Achill Island, special smoke huts were built in the fields, stone structures with sod roofs. From October to May smoky fires burned inside them, and in spring the sods were spread on the fields. In the Amazon basin, there are very extensive areas of dark soil, known as terra preta, enriched by small particles of soot, and these areas are much more fertile than the natural soil.

== Major areas ==
=== Roman Britain ===
In England, dark earth covers many areas that were built up in the Roman period, especially Londinium. In some cases, it may represent open spaces on the edge of urban centres, but can also be found in more rural settings in and around foci of settlement. In the example of London, deposits underlying the ancient city's dark earth are often dated to between the 2nd to 5th century, the middle and later Roman period. Overlying deposits are frequently dated to the 9th century when Saxon London was repopulated and began to expand. The dark earth shows little evidence of any depositional structure or 'horizons', although tip lines are sometimes recorded.

Archaeologists have debated what London's dark earth layer may indicate about human use of the city. It has been taken as evidence of refuse disposal or gardening during the Roman period on the site of previous buildings. In this case it might be evidence of a decline of Londinium's population, or of its partial displacement outside the city walls. However, late Roman cemeteries around London do not show a population decline compared with earlier London.

Alternatively, dark earth might have formed only after abandonment at the end of the Roman period. In this interpretation, dark earth would consist of urban deposits of smoke-impregnated thatch, decayed weeds, timber, and earth floors, reworked and homogenized by worm action, or by agricultural activities, such as ploughing, that mixed building materials from the abandoned Roman cities with material deposited later.

Latest findings in France demonstrated that dark earth may originate from a change from stone to organic building materials; timber and straw will decay and build dark earth. The presence of dark earth does not necessarily imply diminished human activity.

=== Sweden ===
In Sweden, dark earth covering 40 hectares (100 acres) has been found in Uppåkra, in Scania, southern Sweden, where a city-like settlement existed from about the year 1 until 1000 CE when the settlement shifted to modern day Lund. Dark earth over 7 hectares (17 acres) has been found in the Viking city of Björkö (today called Birka), in central Sweden, close to modern Stockholm. Dark earth has also been found in Köpingsvik, on the island of Öland close to the southern Sweden east coast.

=== West Africa ===
Dark earths occur around ruins in the Upper Guinean forests of Ghana, Guinea, Liberia and Sierra Leone. For a period of at least 700 years, West African farmers have enriched the rain forest soils around their towns with compost derived from kitchen, animal, agricultural, and fire waste to produce a signature dark earth. Dark earth is part of the local nomenclature, economically important, and is used judiciously by local communities. The Loma and Mende peoples currently improve soil in this fashion. They well understand how this connects them to the durable legacy of fertile dark earth that encircles the ruined sites in the region. Locals associate the age of their own towns with the depth of their black soil.

=== Amazonian dark earths ===
Amazonian Dark Earths (ADEs) or terra preta do índio (in Portuguese, means "black soil of the Indian") are a type of very dark, fertile artificial (anthropogenic) soil occurring in the Amazon Basin. ADEs owe their characteristic black color to their weathered charcoal content.

== See also ==
- Chernozem
- Terra rossa
- Terramare culture
