= Silver (given name) =

Gender-neutral given name

- Gender: Unisex
- Name day: 31 December

Origin
- Language: English
- Meaning: "Silver"

Other names
- Related names: Silvera, Silvers, Silverberg, Silverstone, Silverstein, Silvermaster, Silvia, Sylvia, Sylvie, Silvio, Silverio, Silveira, Silveria, Silveri, Silverblatt, Silverman, Silverton, Silverthorne, Silverthorn, Silva, Sylvester, Silber

Silver is a gender-neutral given name which can also be used as a male or female nickname.

People named Silver include:

- Silver Ayoo (born 1950), Ugandan athlete
- Silver Donald Cameron (1937–2020), Canadian journalist
- Silver Ezeikpe (born 1971), Nigerian athlete
- Silver Eensaar (born 1978), Estonian racer
- Silver Flint (1855–1892), American baseball player
- Silver Horn (1860–1940), Kiowa artist
- Silver Kayemba, Ugandan military officer
- Silver King (baseball) (1868–1938), American baseball player
- Silver King (wrestler) (1968–2019), Mexican wrestler and actor
- Silver Koulouris (born 1947), Greek musician
- Silver Leppik (born 1983), Estonian basketball player
- Silver Maar (born 1999), Estonian volleyball player
- Silver Meikar (born 1978), Estonian politician, human rights activist and journalist
- Silver Bell Morris (born 2004), Australian soccer player
- Silver Mugisha (born 1968), Ugandan civil engineer and corporate executive
- Silver (cartoonist) (born 1952), real name Guido Silvestri, Italian cartoonist
- Silver Oliver (1736–1798), Irish landowner and politician
- Silver Pozzoli (born 1953), Italian singer
- Silver Quilty (1891–1976), Canadian football player
- Silver RavenWolf (born 1956), American neopaganist author and lecturer
- Silver Sonntak (born 1976), Estonian rower
- Silver Siegers (born 2000), Dutch cricketer
- Silver Sphere (born 1999), American singer-songwriter
- Silver Tree (born 1977), American film producer
- Silver X (born 1988), South Sundanese musical artist

== See also ==
- Elmer Zacher (1880–1944), American baseball player nicknamed "Silver"
- Silver Surfer, comic book character
- Silver the Hedgehog, video game character
