= Silberberg =

Silberberg is German for "Silver Mountain" or "Silver Hill" and may refer to:

== Mountains, hills and hill spurs ==
Austria

- Silberberg (Tyrol) (ca. 1,200 m; mit Silberbergalm, 1,175 m), near Reith im Alpbachtal (near Brixlegg), Inn valley, North Tyrol

Germany

- Großer Silberberg (ca. 81 m), in Magdeburg, Saxony-Anhalt
- Kleiner Silberberg (ca. 59 m), in Magdeburg, Saxony-Anhalt
- Silberberg (Ahrweiler) (295.1 m), near Bad Neuenahr-Ahrweiler, county of Ahrweiler, Rhineland-Palatinate
- Silberberg (Bodenheim) (ca. 211 m), highest point in the municipality of Bodenheim, county of Mainz-Bingen, Rhineland-Palatinate
- Silberberg (Bodenmais) (Bischofshaube; ca. 955 m), in Bodenmais, county of Regen, Bayern
- Silberberg (Greifswald) (4.3 m), in Greifswald, Landkreis county of Vorpommern-Greifswald, Mecklenburg-Western Pomerania
- Silberberg (Hagen am Teutoburger Wald) (179.8 m), near Hagen am Teutoburger Wald, county of Osnabrück, Lower Saxony
- Silberberg (Mühlhausen) (431.6 m), near Mühlhausen an der Würm, county of Enzkreis, Baden-Württemberg
- Silberberg (Kellerwald) (ca. 523 m), in the Kellerwald near Hundsdorf (Bad Wildungen, county of Waldeck-Frankenberg, Hesse
- Silberberg (Thuringian Forest) (770.6 m) near Möhrenbach, Ilm-Kreis, Thuringia
- Silberberg (Todtnau) (1,358.2 m), near Todtnau, in the Southern Black Forest, county of Lörrach, Baden-Württemberg
- Silberberg (Wingst) (ca. 74 m), near Dobrock, in the Wingst, county of Cuxhaven, Lower Saxony
- Silberberg (Winterberg-Silbach) (747.5 m), bei Winterberg-Silbach, county of Hochsauerlandkreis, North Rhine-Westphalia

Poland

- Silberberg, a hill north of Wolin, Poland, according to the Nordisk familjebok site of the Jomsborg Viking stronghold

== Places ==
Austria

- Silberberg (Deutschfeistritz), village in the municipality of Deutschfeistritz, Styria
- Silberberg (Kogelberg), hamlet in the municipality of Kaindorf an der Sulm, Styria
- Silberberg (Kaltenberg), cadastral municipality and village in the municipality of Kaltenberg, Upper Austria

Czech Republic

- Silberberg, German name for Orlovice, village in Pocinovice
- Silberberg, German name for a village in Nalžovské Hory

Germany

- Silberberg (Leonberg), district of Leonberg, Baden-Württemberg
- Silberberg (Renningen), district of Renningen, Baden-Württemberg
- Silberberg (Bad Saarow), residential area of Bad Saarow, Brandenburg
- Großer Silberberg (district), district of Magdeburg, Saxony-Anhalt

Places in Poland

- Silberberg, German name for Srebrna Góra, Lower Silesian Voivodeship, Poland
- Silberberg, German name for Święciechów, village in Drawno

== Other meanings ==
- Burgruine Silberberg, a castle in Carinthia, Austria
- Oflag VIII-B Silberberg, a World War II German POW camp
