= Silberstein =

Silberstein is a surname. Notable people with the surname include:

- Ascher Silberstein (1852–1909), American philanthropist
- Antonina Vallentin 1893–1957), Polish-born writer
- August Silberstein (1827–1900), Austrian writer
- Jascha Silberstein (1934–2008), Polish-American musician
- Louis Silberstein (1889–1954), American composer
- Ludwik Silberstein (1872–1948), Polish-American physicist
- Robert Ellis Silberstein (born 1946), American music executive
- Solomon Silberstein (1845–1919), Russian-American writer

== See also ==
- Silverstein
- Silvers
