= Bodenmais =

- Municipality
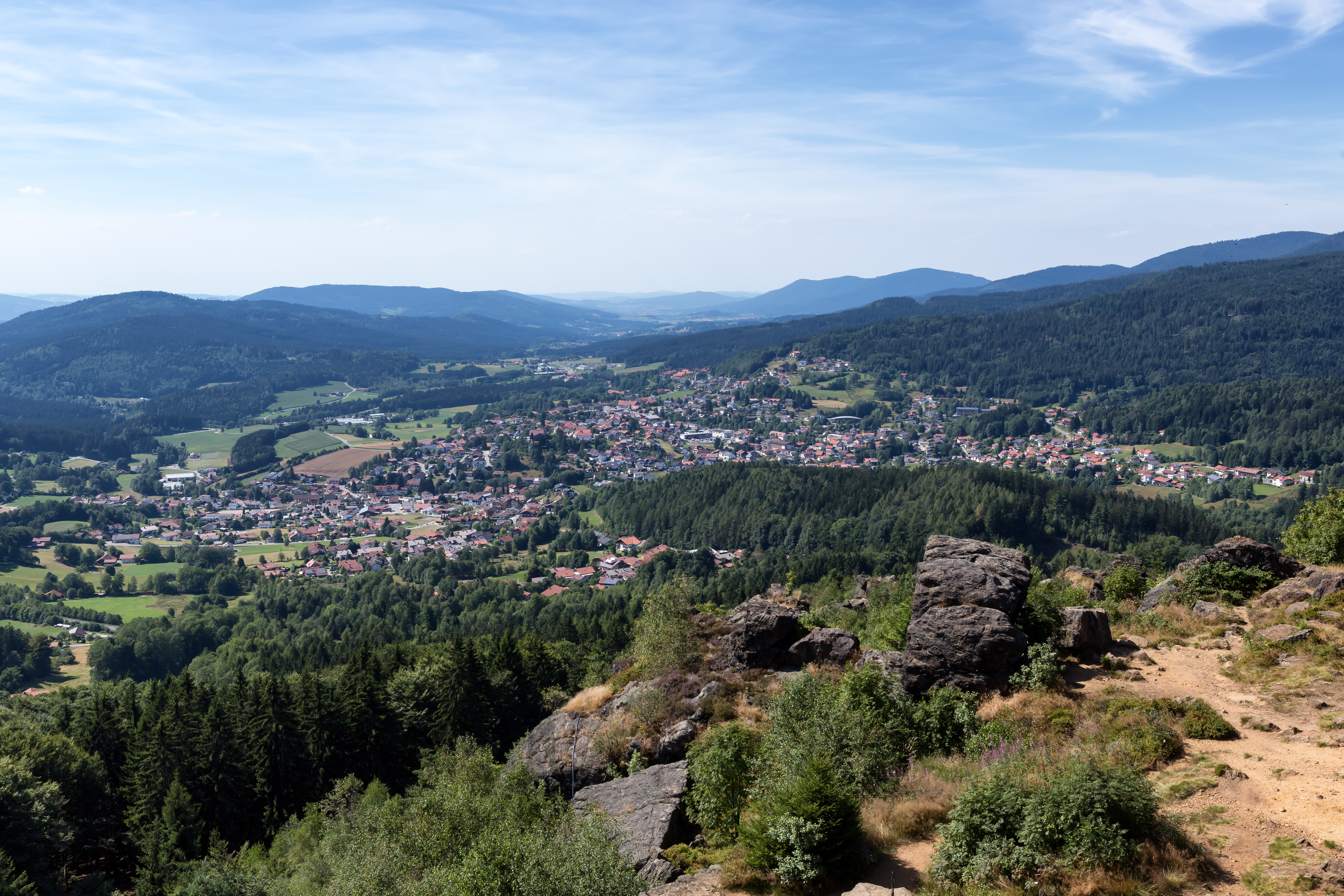
- Bodenmais seen from the Silberberg mountain

- Coat of arms

- Location of Bodenmais within Regen district
- Interactive map of Bodenmais
- Location within Germany Location within Bavaria
- Coordinates: 49°4′N 13°6′E
- Country: Germany
- State: Bavaria
- Admin. region: Niederbayern
- District: Regen

Government
  - Mayor (2023–29): Michael Adam (SPD)

Area
  - Total: 45.29 km^{2} (17.49 sq mi)
- Elevation: 689 m (2,260 ft)

Population (2025-12-31)
  - Total: 3,646
  - Density: 80.50/km^{2} (208.5/sq mi)
- Time zone: UTC+01:00 (CET)
  - Summer (DST): UTC+02:00 (CEST)
- Postal codes: 94249
- Dialling codes: 09924
- Vehicle registration: REG
- Website: www.bodenmais.de

Bodenmais (German pronunciation: [ˈboːdn̩ˌmaɪs]) is a municipality in the district of Regen in Bavaria, Germany. It lies at one end of the Zeller Valley in the Bavarian Forest.

The tourist attractions at the Silberberg mountain, with its former silver mine, include cross-country skiing tracks as well as an alpine skiing hill (about 1,050 m (3,440 ft) above sea level) in winter, doubling in summer as a 600 m (2,000 ft) long alpine slide. There is also a mining museum, reminding of ages of ferro-oxide mining and vitriol production. Some shafts are still accessible.

The village itself is known for its glass shops, the most notable being Joska Glasparadies (Joska glass paradise).

== Name ==
There is a reference in 1301 which called it Pabenmaizz. Loosely translated it means the wood was chopped under the lead of Popo, or Bobo, who possible came around 800 from the slavic Part of Europe.
