= Silverstein =

Silverstein may refer to:

- Silverstein (surname)
- Silverstein (band), a Canadian post-hardcore band
- Silverstein Committee, 1959 United States government commission on the Saturn program
- Silverstein Properties, a real estate development and management company

== See also ==
- Silberstein
