= Silverthorn =

Silverthorn may refer to:

- Silverthorn (album), an album by Kamelot
- Silverthorn (novel), a novel by Raymond E. Feist
- Silverthorn, Toronto, a neighbourhood in Toronto
- Silverthorn Collegiate Institute
- Silverthorn, a character on The Girl from Tomorrow
- Elaeagnus pungens, a species of flowering plant in the family Elaeagnaceae

== People with the surname ==
- Merwin H. Silverthorn (1896–1985), United States Marine Corps general
- Willis C. Silverthorn (1838–1916), American lawyer, judge, banker, politician and businessman

== See also ==
- Silverthorne, Colorado
- Silverthorne (microprocessor)
- Silverthorne (surname)
