= Silverberg =

Silverberg (English adaptation of German: Silberberg, meaning "a silver mountain" in German and Yiddish) is a surname. Notable persons with that name include:

- Alice Silverberg, American mathematician
- Brad Silverberg, American computer scientist and businessman
- Christine E. Silverberg (born 1949), Canadian lawyer and police chief
- Cory Silverberg, Canadian sex educator, author, public speaker and blogger
- Daniel Silverberg, American assistant film and television director
- Ira Silverberg, American literary agent
- Jake Silverberg (born 1996), American cyclist
- Jan-Erik Silfverberg (born 1953), former professional ice hockey player
- Kristen Silverberg (born c. 1970), American diplomat
- Paul Silverberg (1876-1959), German industrialist
- Pinky Silverberg (1904–1964), American boxer
- Robert Silverberg (born 1935), American science fiction writer
- Stanley M. Silverberg (1919–1953), American lawyer

== See also ==
- Silberberg (disambiguation)
