= Silverstone (disambiguation) =

Silverstone is a village in Northamptonshire, England, United Kingdom

Silverstone may also refer to:

== People ==
- Alicia Silverstone (born 1976), American actress
- Arnold Silverstone, Baron Ashdown (1911–1977), British property developer
- Ben Silverstone (born 1979), British actor and barrister
- David Silverstone (1907–1971), Canadian fencer
- Gedaliah Silverstone (1871−1944), Russian-born Orthodox rabbi and author
- Lou Silverstone (1924–2015), American comedy writer, particularly for Mad magazine
- Marilyn Silverstone (1929–1999), English photojournalist and Buddhist nun
- Mark Woolf Silverstone (1880–1951), Polish-born New Zealand cabinet-maker, socialist, local politician and financier

== Transportation ==
- Healey Silverstone, a roadster made by Donald Healey Motor Company
- XKR Silverstone, a limited edition of the Jaguar XK (X100) automobile
- Silverstone Tire, a tire company bought by Toyo
- Silverstone Air, a former Kenyan airline

== Other uses ==
- Silverstone, North Carolina, an unincorporated community, United States
- Silverstone Circuit, a motor racing circuit near the English village of Silverstone
  - Silverstone Heliport, which serves the racing circuit
  - Silverstone University Technical College
- RAF Silverstone, a former Royal Air Force station, the site now occupied by the Silverstone Circuit
- Silverstone (plastic), a plastic coating, similar to Teflon
- "Silverstone" (The Apprentice), a 2022 television episode
- Silverstone, the name of a "show within a show" on the TV programme The Famous Jett Jackson

== See also ==
- Silverstone's salamander, a species of salamander
- Silvertone (album), common misspelling of the first album by Chris Isaak
- Silverstein (disambiguation)
