= Silvermaster =

Silvermaster may refer to:

- Helen Silvermaster (1899–1991), Soviet spy
- Nathan Gregory Silvermaster (1898–1964), Soviet Spy
- FBI Silvermaster File, 162 volume FBI archive on the Silvermaster spy group
