= Solomon Silberstein =

- Born: March 10, 1845; Slobodka, Kovno Governorate, Russian Empire
- Died: January 21, 1919 (aged 73); The Bronx, New York City, United States
- Writing career
- Language: English, Hebrew, Yiddish

Solomon Joseph Silberstein (Yiddish: שלום יוסף זילבערשטיין, romanized: Sholem Yosef Zilbershteyn; March 10, 1845 – January 21, 1919) was a Russian–American philosophical writer and poet.

Silberstein was born in Slobodka, Russian Empire, to Zibhya (née Sandler) and Rabbi Aaron Silberstein. He was the grandson of the Kabbalist Naphtali Herz Ritever. Educated privately, he received the rabbinical diploma in 1864, and officiated from 1867 to 1868 as rabbi at Dershunisok, in the government of Kovno. He emigrated to the United States in 1881 and settled in New York City.

== Publications ==
- Gelui enayim [Open Eyes]. 1881.
- Ha-dat veha-Torah [Religion and Law]. 880-03Sefer ha-Dat veha-Torah (in Hebrew). New York: Brody & Chelimer. 1887.
- The Universe and Its Evolution. New York: L. Rabinowitz. 1891.
- Metsi'ut Hashem veha-olam [Divinity and the Cosmos]. New York: A. H. Rosenberg. 1893.
- Six General Laws of Nature. New York: s.n. 1894.
- The Disclosures of the Universal Mysteries. New York: P. Cowen. 1896.
- The Jewish Problem and Theology in General. New York: s.n. 1904.
- Takanat agunot [Remedial Laws for Deserted Wives]. Remedial laws for deserted wives (in Yiddish). New York: A. H. Rosenberg. 1907.
