= Silverblatt =

Silverblatt is a surname. Notable people with the surname include:

- Howard Silverblatt (1909–1986), birth name of Howard Da Silva, American actor, director, and musical performer
- Irene Silverblatt (born 1948), American cultural anthropologist
- Michael Silverblatt (1952–2026), American literary critic and broadcaster
