= Silveri =

Silveri is a surname. Notable people with the surname include:

- Anastasia Silveri (born 1984), Russian-born Italian fashion model
- Paolo Gentiloni (born Paolo Gentiloni Silveri, 1954), Italian politician and former prime minister
- Paolo Silveri (1913–2001), Italian opera singer
- Scott Silveri, American television producer and writer

Fictional characters:

- Gigi Silveri, a character in the television series One Tree Hill
