= Kaindorf an der Sulm =

- Former municipality
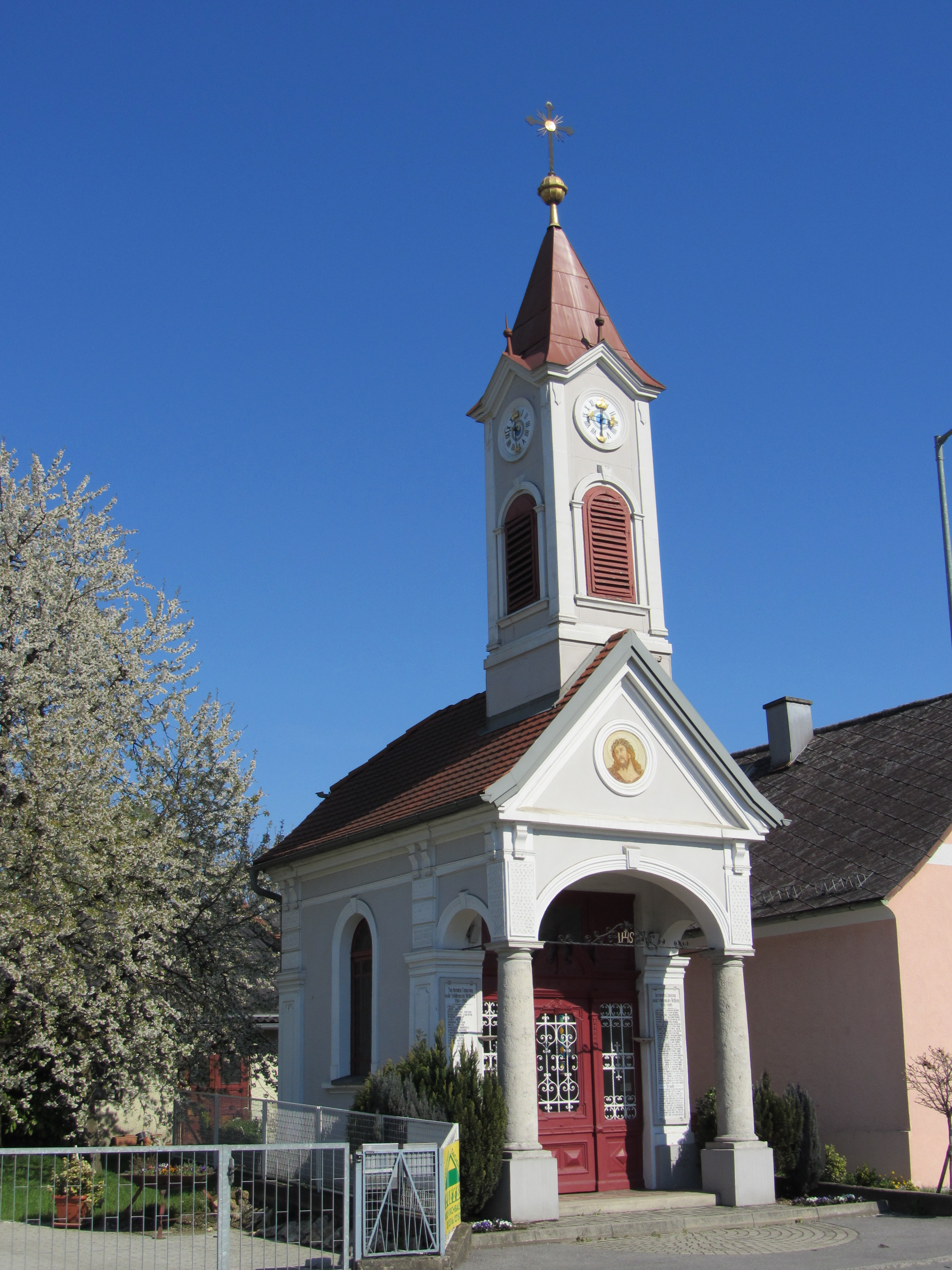
- Kaindorf chapel

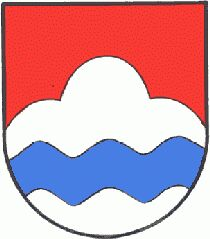
- Coat of arms

- Location within Austria
- Coordinates: 46°48′00″N 15°32′00″E
- Country: Austria
- State: Styria
- District: Leibnitz

Area
  - Total: 6.55 km^{2} (2.53 sq mi)
- Elevation: 245 m (804 ft)

Population (1 January 2016)
  - Total: 2,510
  - Density: 383/km^{2} (992/sq mi)
- Time zone: UTC+1 (CET)
  - Summer (DST): UTC+2 (CEST)
- Postal code: 8430
- Area code: 03452
- Vehicle registration: LB
- Website: www.kaindorf-sulm.at

Kaindorf an der Sulm is a former municipality in the district of Leibnitz in the Austrian state of Styria. Since the 2015 Styria municipal structural reform, it is part of the municipality Leibnitz.
