= Silverton (surname) =

Silverton is a surname. Notable people with the surname include:

- Kate Silverton (born 1970), English journalist, newsreader, and broadcaster
- Michael Silverton, American computer scientist
- Nancy Silverton (born 1954), American chef, baker, and author
