= Burgruine Silberberg =

Castle ruin in Austria

Coordinates: 47.0057°N 14.5310°E

- Carinthia, Austria
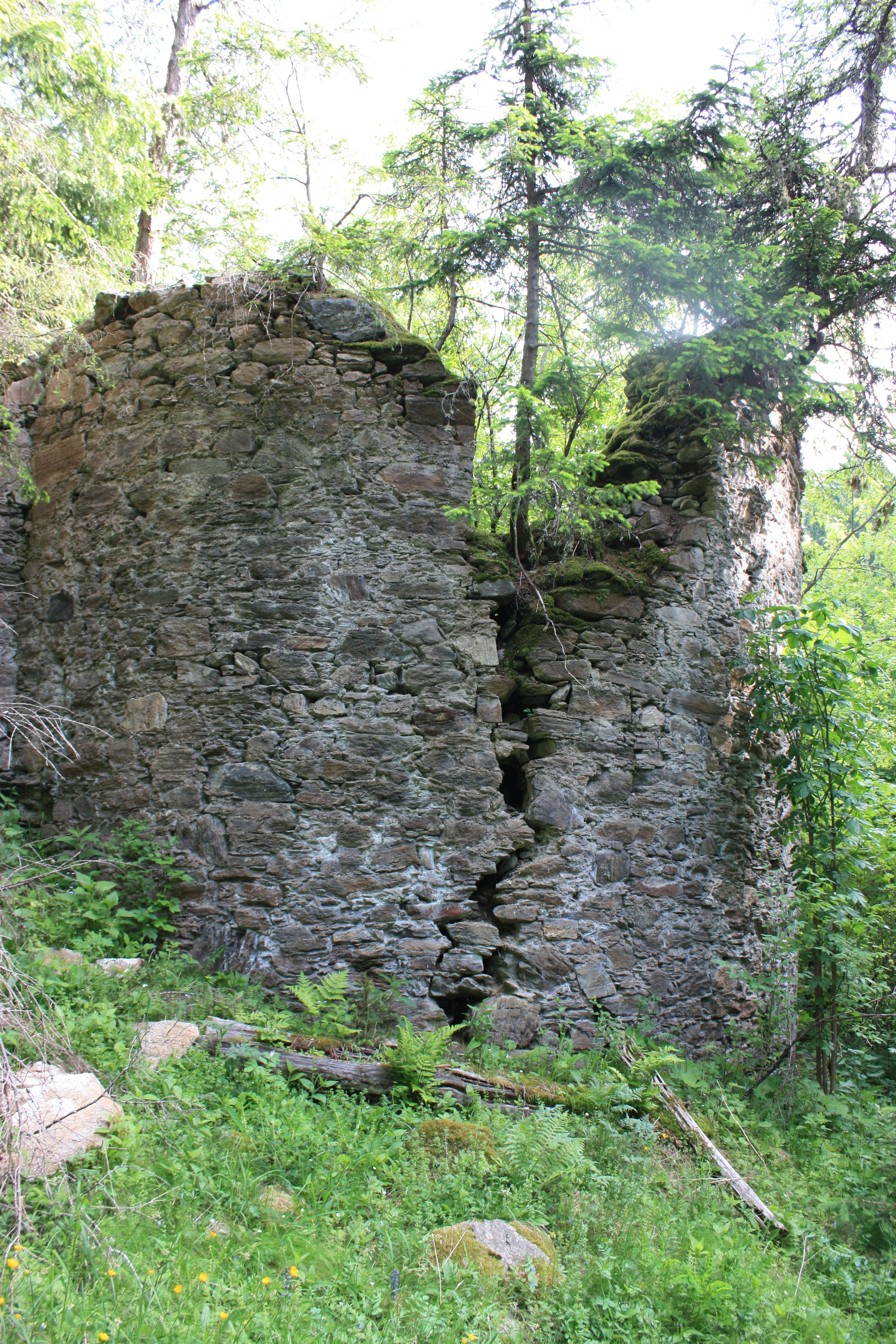

Site information
- Type: Castle

Burgruine Silberberg is a castle in Carinthia, Austria.

== See also ==
- List of castles in Austria
