= Pocinovice =

- Municipality
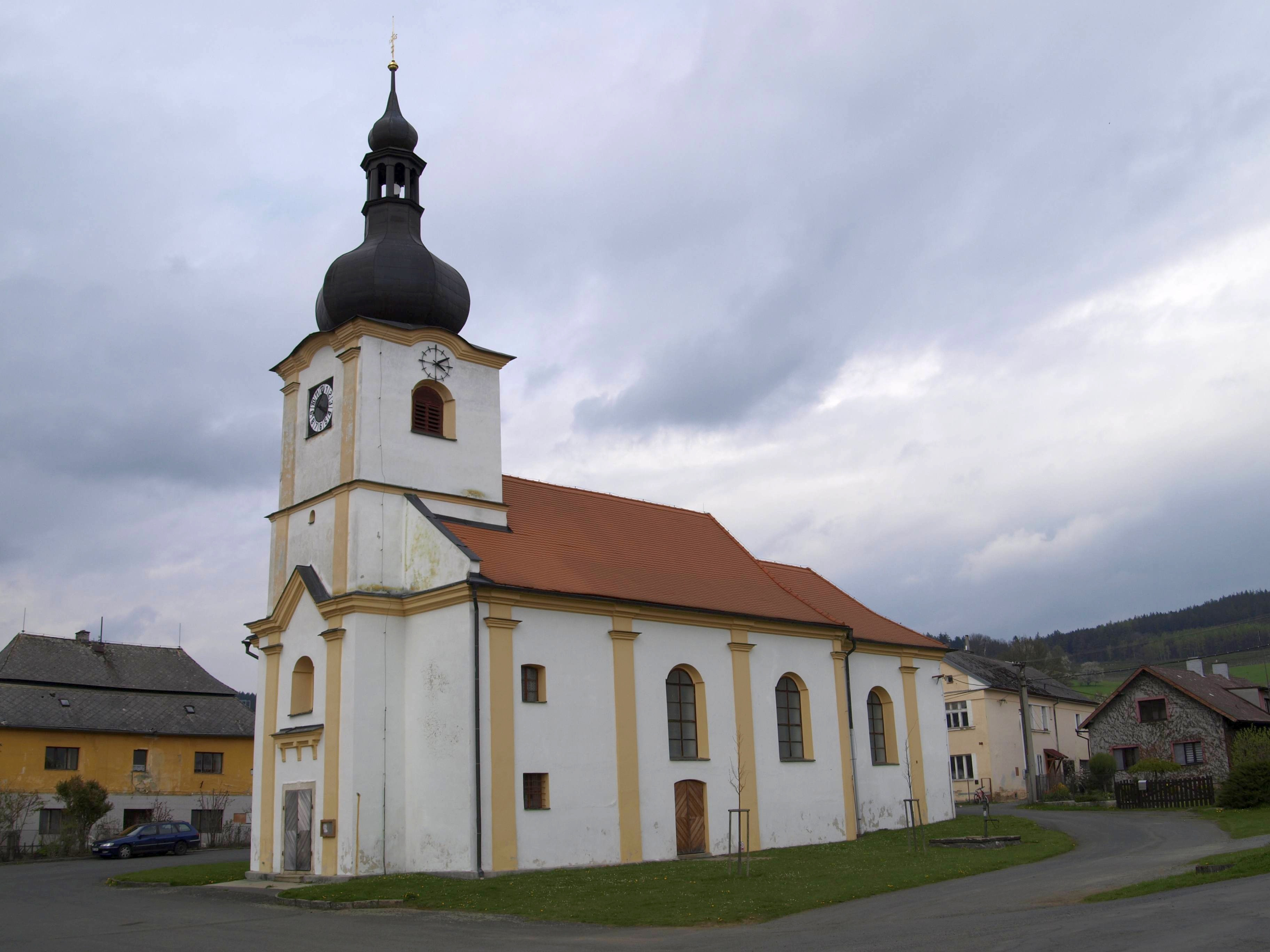
- Church of Saint Anne

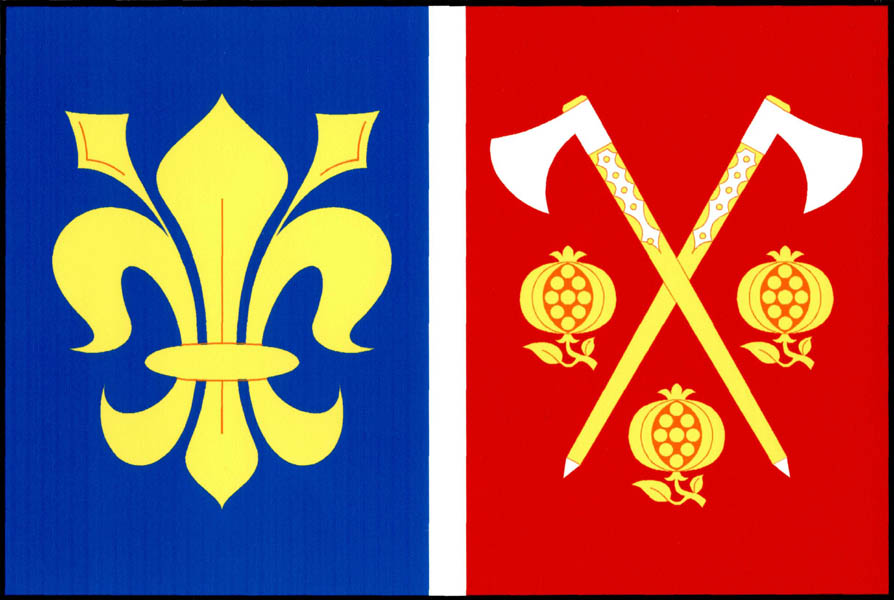
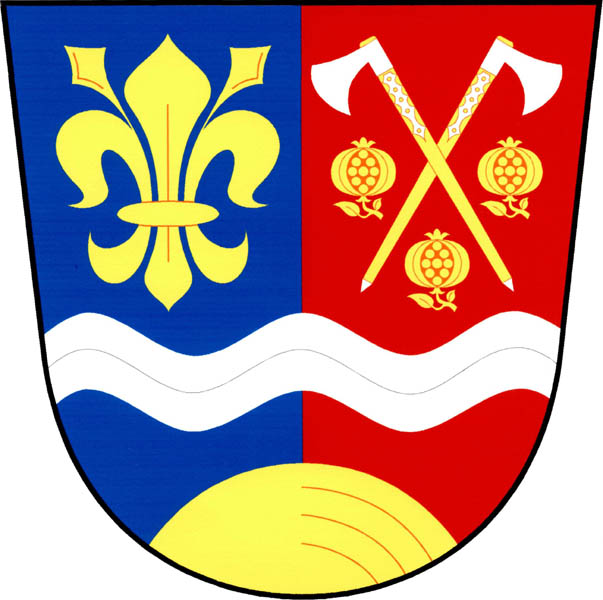
- Flag Coat of arms

- Location in the Czech Republic
- Coordinates: 49°20′37″N 13°8′0″E
- Country: Czech Republic
- Region: Plzeň
- District: Domažlice
- First mentioned: 1325

Area
  - Total: 24.61 km^{2} (9.50 sq mi)
- Elevation: 448 m (1,470 ft)

Population (2026-01-01)
  - Total: 589
  - Density: 23.9/km^{2} (62.0/sq mi)
- Time zone: UTC+1 (CET)
  - Summer (DST): UTC+2 (CEST)
- Postal codes: 345 06, 345 09
- Website: www.pocinovice.cz

Pocinovice (German: Putzeried) is a municipality and village in Domažlice District in the Plzeň Region of the Czech Republic. It has about 600 inhabitants.

== Administrative division ==
Pocinovice consists of two municipal parts (in brackets population according to the 2021 census):

- Pocinovice (552)
- Orlovice (10)

== Etymology ==
The initial name of the village was Počinovice. The name was derived from the personal name Počin, meaning "the village of Počin's people". The name was distorted due to the Germanisation of the region.

== Geography ==
Pocinovice is located about 12 kilometres (7 mi) southwest of Klatovy, 18 km (11 mi) southeast of Domažlice and 47 km (29 mi) south of Plzeň. It lies on the border between the Cham-Furth Depression and Švihov Highlands. The highest point is the hill Jezvinec at 739 m (2,425 ft) above sea level. The Andělice Stream flows through the municipality.

The top of Jezvinec and its surroundings is protected as the Jezvinec Nature Reserve. It has an area of 11.2 ha (28 acres). It is protected due the abundant occurrence of lunaria rediviva and other endangered forest plant species.

== History ==
The first written mention of Pocinovice is in a deed of King John of Bohemia from 1325. It was the largest village of the Chodsko ethnographical region, inhabited by the Chods.

== Demographics ==
Historical population

Year	Pop.	±%
1869	1,276	—
1880	1,333	+4.5%
1890	1,281	−3.9%
1900	1,210	−5.5%
1910	1,225	+1.2%

Year	Pop.	±%
1921	1,216	−0.7%
1930	1,214	−0.2%
1950	881	−27.4%
1961	850	−3.5%
1970	729	−14.2%

Year	Pop.	±%
1980	594	−18.5%
1991	599	+0.8%
2001	564	−5.8%
2011	543	−3.7%
2021	562	+3.5%

Source: Censuses

== Transport ==
Pocinovice is located on the railway line Klatovy–Domažlice.

== Sights ==
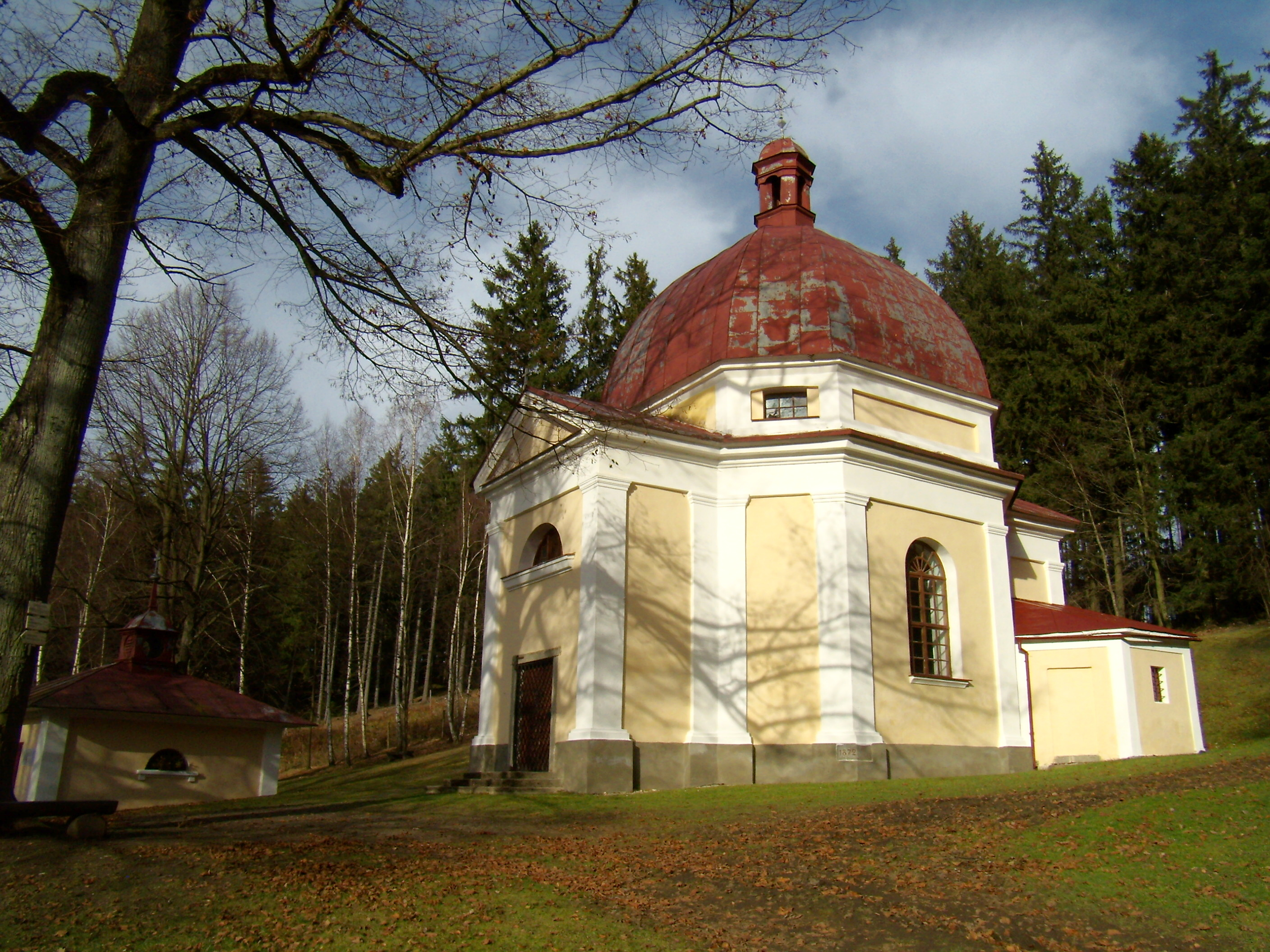
Dobrá Voda pilgrimage site

The historic core of Pocinovice is protected as a village monument zone. It is valuable for its preserved set of timbered cottages from the 19th century, typical of the Chodsko ethnographical region.

The main landmark of Pocinovice is the Church of Saint Anne. It was built in the late Baroque style in 1805–1806.

In the forest in the northern part of the municipality is a pilgrimage site called Dobrá Voda. It is formed by a spring of water, the Chapel of Our Lady of Lourdes, and the Chapel of Our Lady of Sorrows. Originally, the Chapel of Our Lady of Lourdes was a wooden chapel from the 17th century, but in 1872 it was replaced by a new wooden building, and in 1908, after the wooden chapel burned down, it was replaced by the current brick building. The Chapel of Our Lady of Sorrows was built in 1872–1873. The way from the village to the pilgrimage site is lined with the Stations of the Cross from 1882.
