= Silverthorne (surname) =

Silverthorne is a surname. Notable people with the surname include:

- Alexandra Silverthorne (born 1980), American photographer
- Dennis Silverthorne (1923-2004), British pair skater
- Jane Silverthorne (1953–2022), British plant biologist
- Jeanne Silverthorne (born 1950), American artist
- Jeffrey Silverthorne (born 1946), American photographer
- Judith Silverthorne (born 1953), Canadian author
- Paul Silverthorne (born 1951), British violist
- Thora Silverthorne (1910-1990), British Communist activist
- Winifred Silverthorne (1925–1998), British pair skater
