= Silverstein (surname) =

Silverstein is a surname. Notable people with the surname include:

- Abe Silverstein (1908–2001), American aerospace engineer
- Alan Silverstein, American rabbi
- Charles Silverstein (1935-2023), American writer and magazine editor
- Debra Silverstein, American politician
- Duane Silverstein, American environmentalist
- Elliot Silverstein (1927-2023), American director
- Eva Silverstein, American physicist and string theorist
- Ira Silverstein (born 1960), American politician from Illinois
- Jake Silverstein (born 1975), American magazine editor
- Jamie Silverstein (born 1983), American figure skater
- Joseph Silverstein (1932-2015), American violinist and orchestra conductor
- Keith Silverstein (born 1970), American voice actor
- Ken Silverstein, American magazine editor and blogger
- Larry Silverstein (born 1931), American real estate investor
- Louis Silverstein (1919–2011), American artist and graphic designer
- Martin J. Silverstein (born 1954), American attorney and diplomat
- Matt Silverstein, American television writer
- Max Silverstein (1911–1942), American military officer
- Michael Silverstein (1945–2020), American anthropological linguist
- Murray Silverstein, American architect and philologist
- Rich Silverstein, American businessperson
- Ruffy Silverstein (American wrestler) (1914–1980), American wrestler
- Ruffy Silverstein (Canadian wrestler) (born 1972), Canadian wrestler
- Shel Silverstein (1930–1999), American author, poet and cartoonist of children's books
- Thomas Silverstein (1952–2019), American murderer
