= Silberberg (Bodenmais) =

Mountain in Germany

Coordinates: 49°03′26″N 13°07′27″E

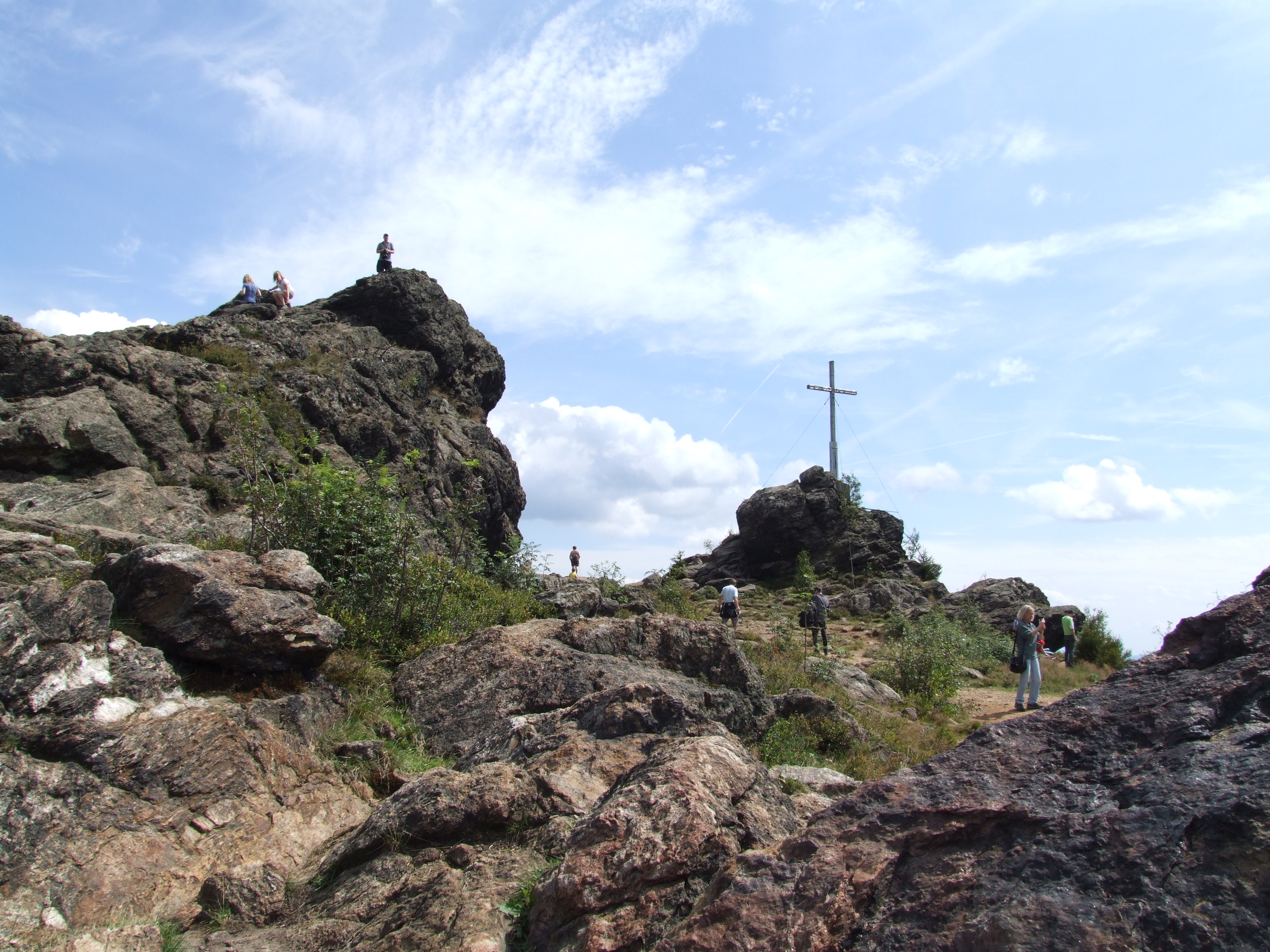
- The twin peaks of Silberberg from west direction

Highest point
- Elevation: 955 m (3,133 ft)

Geography
- Location: Bavarian Forest, Bavaria, Germany,

Silberberg (German pronunciation: [ˈzɪlbɐˌbɛʁk]) is a mountain of Bavarian Forest, Bavaria, Germany.

== Gallery ==
=== cable car, toboggan run, ski run ===
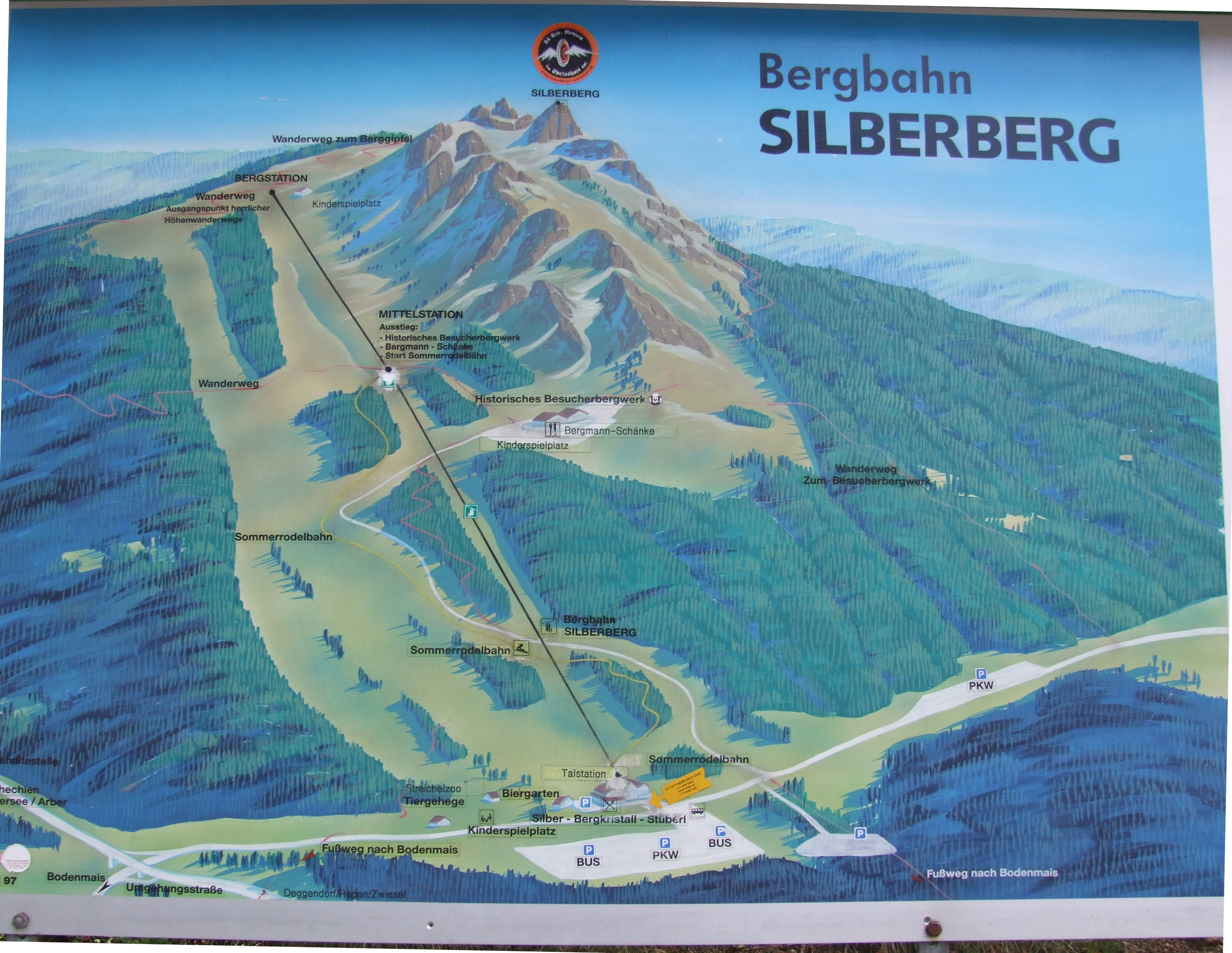
Panoramic map cable railway Silberberg - summer version

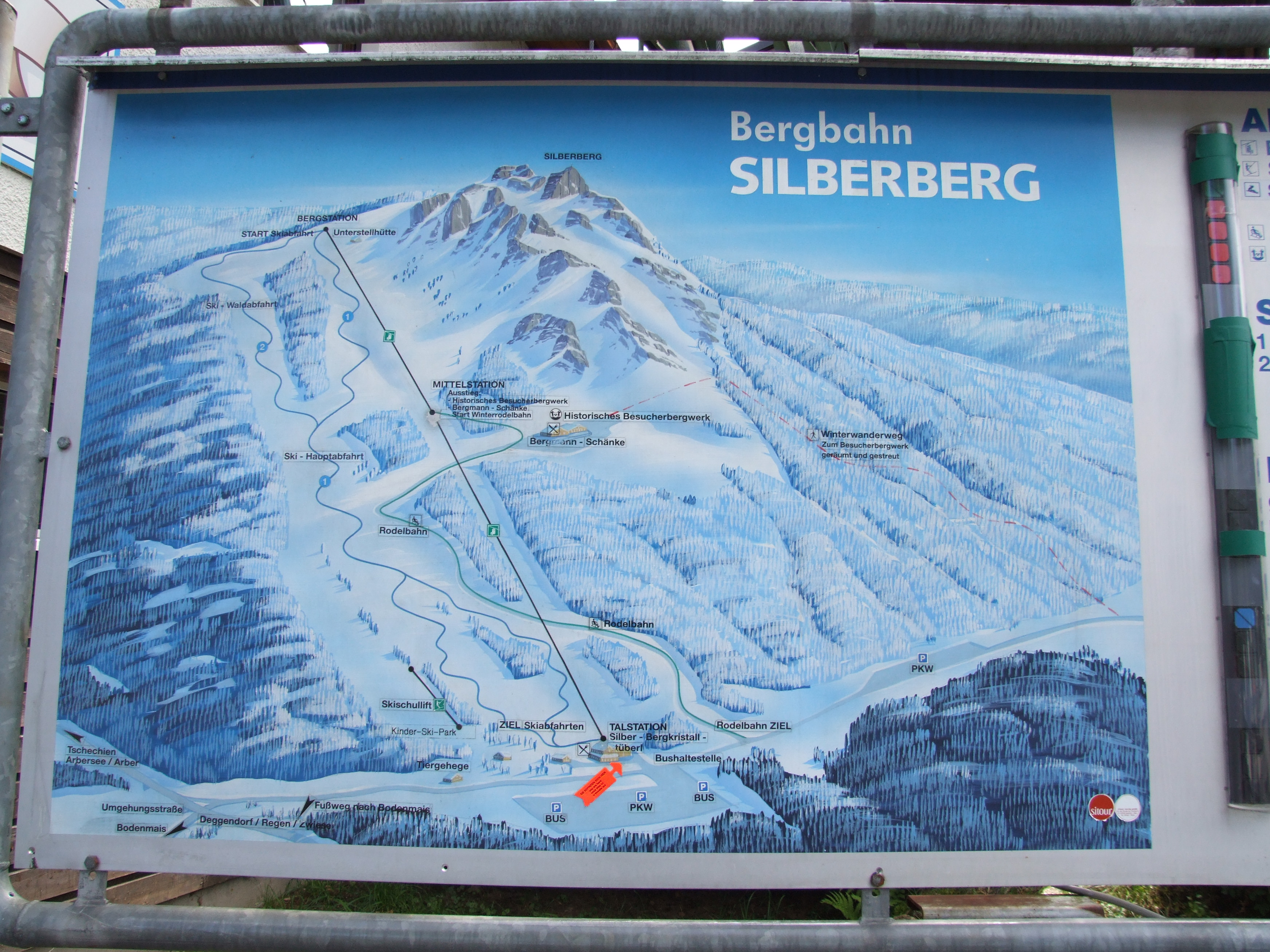
Panoramic map cable railway Silberberg - winter version

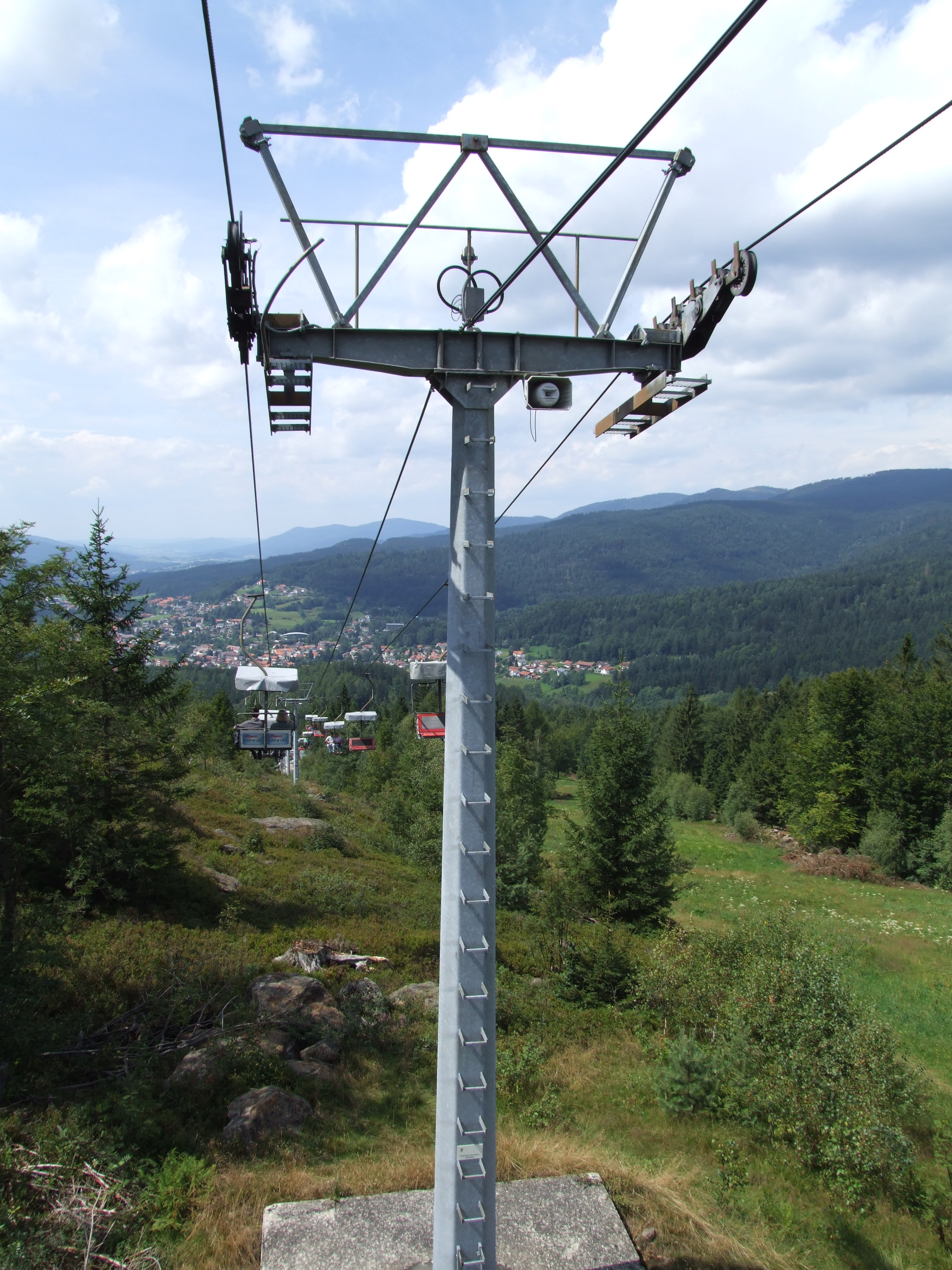
A pillar of cable railway Silberberg

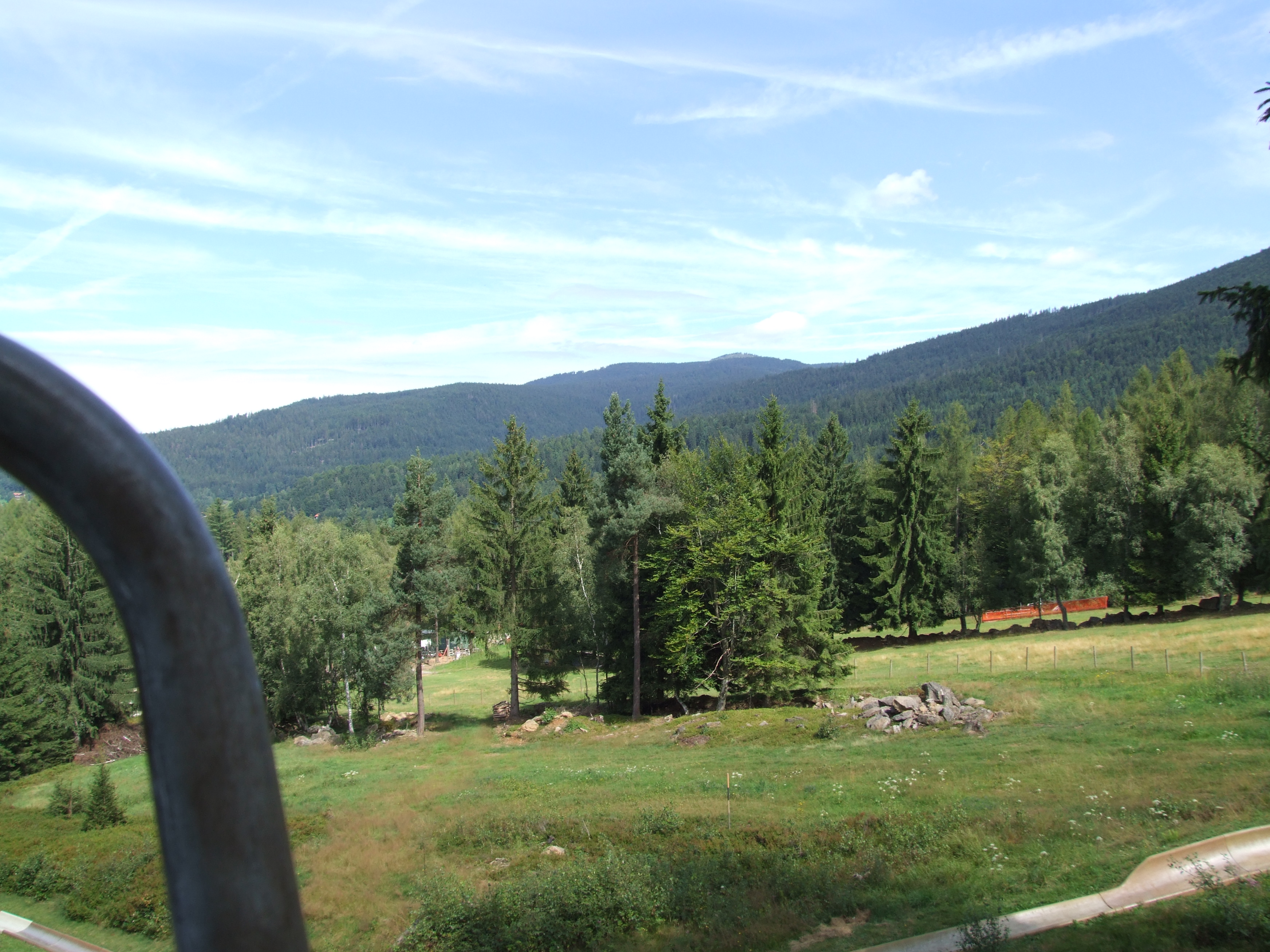
View from the cable car to the downhill ski area in the summer

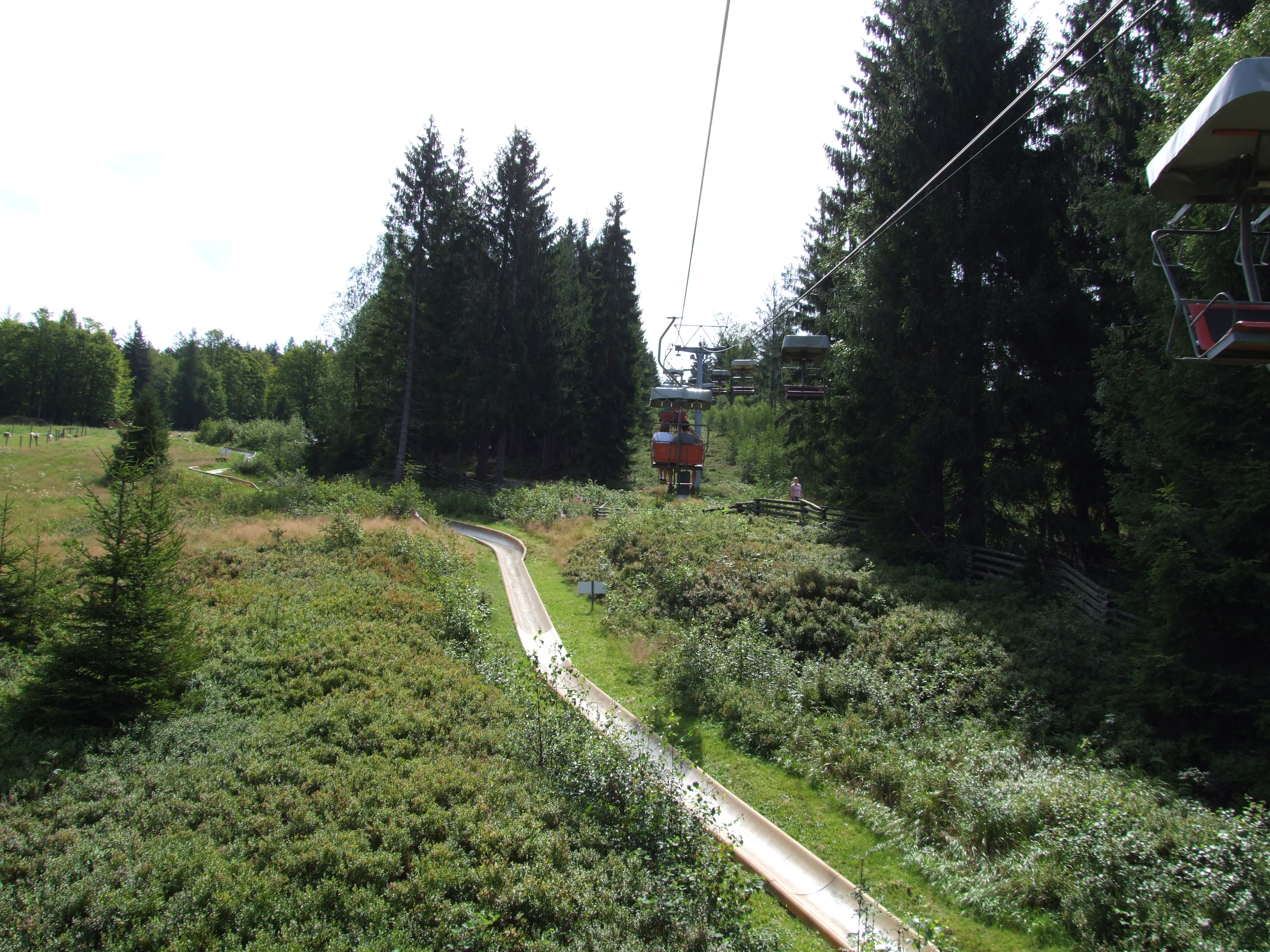
View to the summer toboggan run

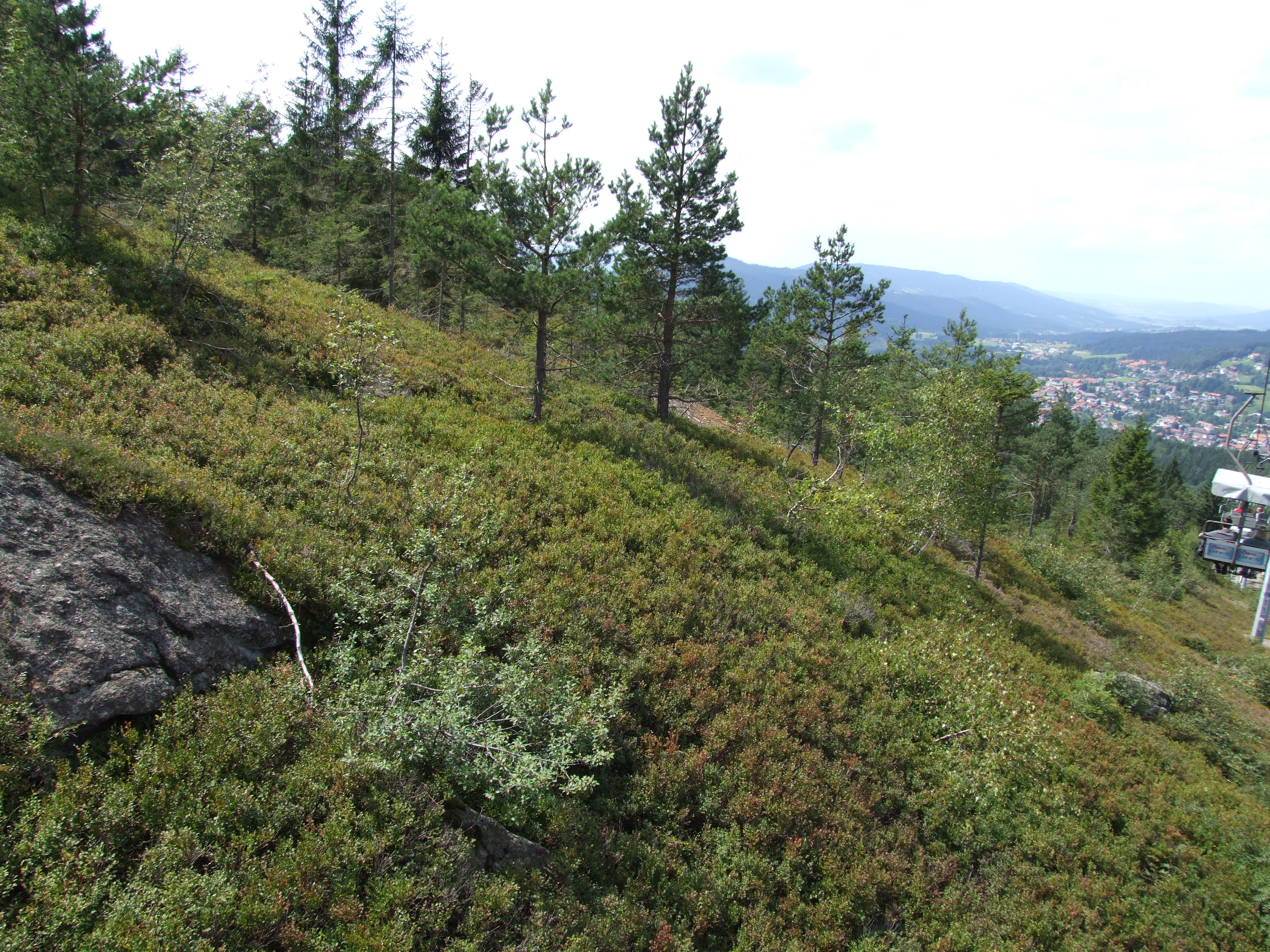
View from the little wooded hillside

=== Summit area of Silberberg ===
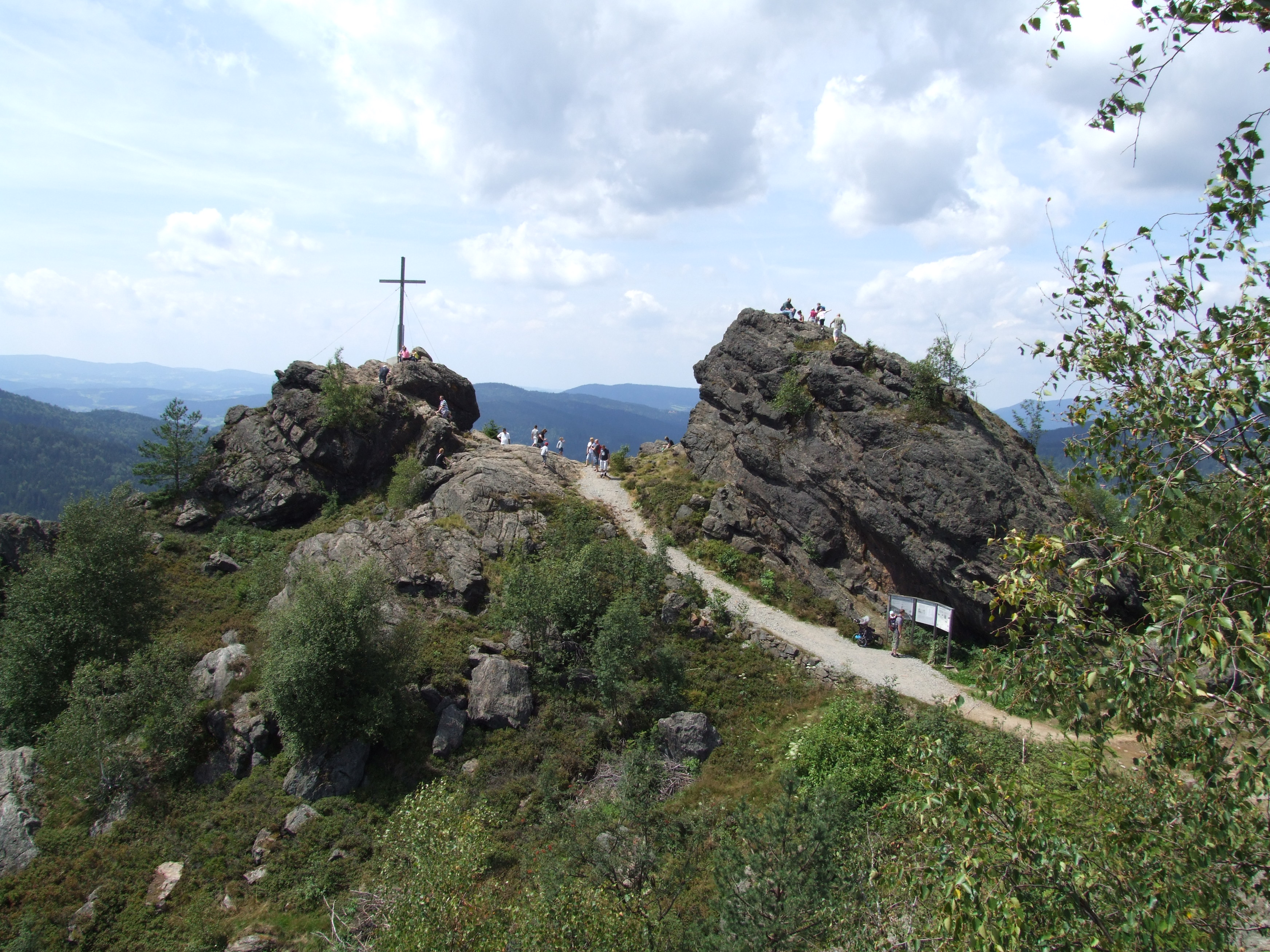
Seen twin peaks of Silberberg from the east.

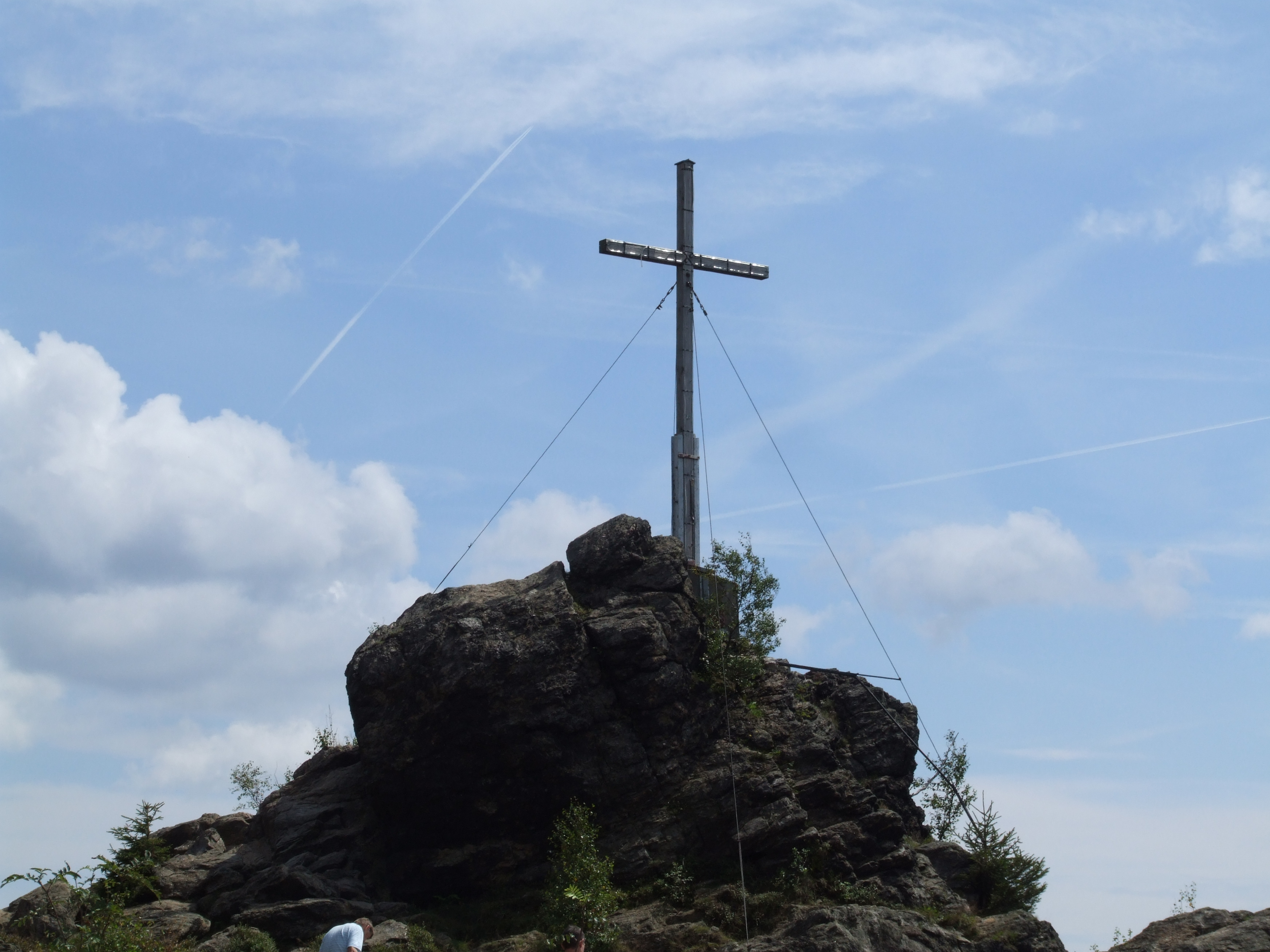
summit cross

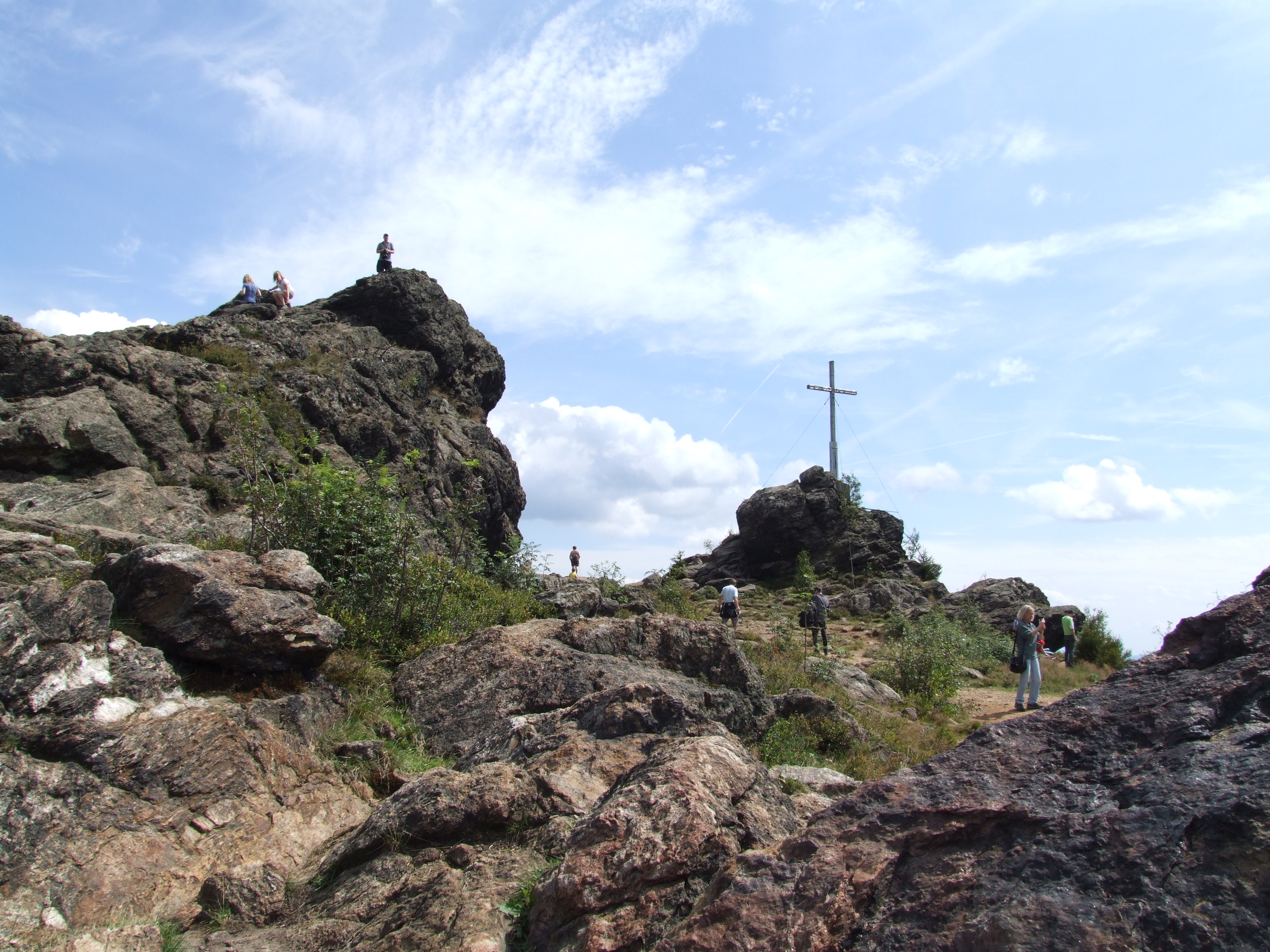
The twin peaks of Silberberg from west direction

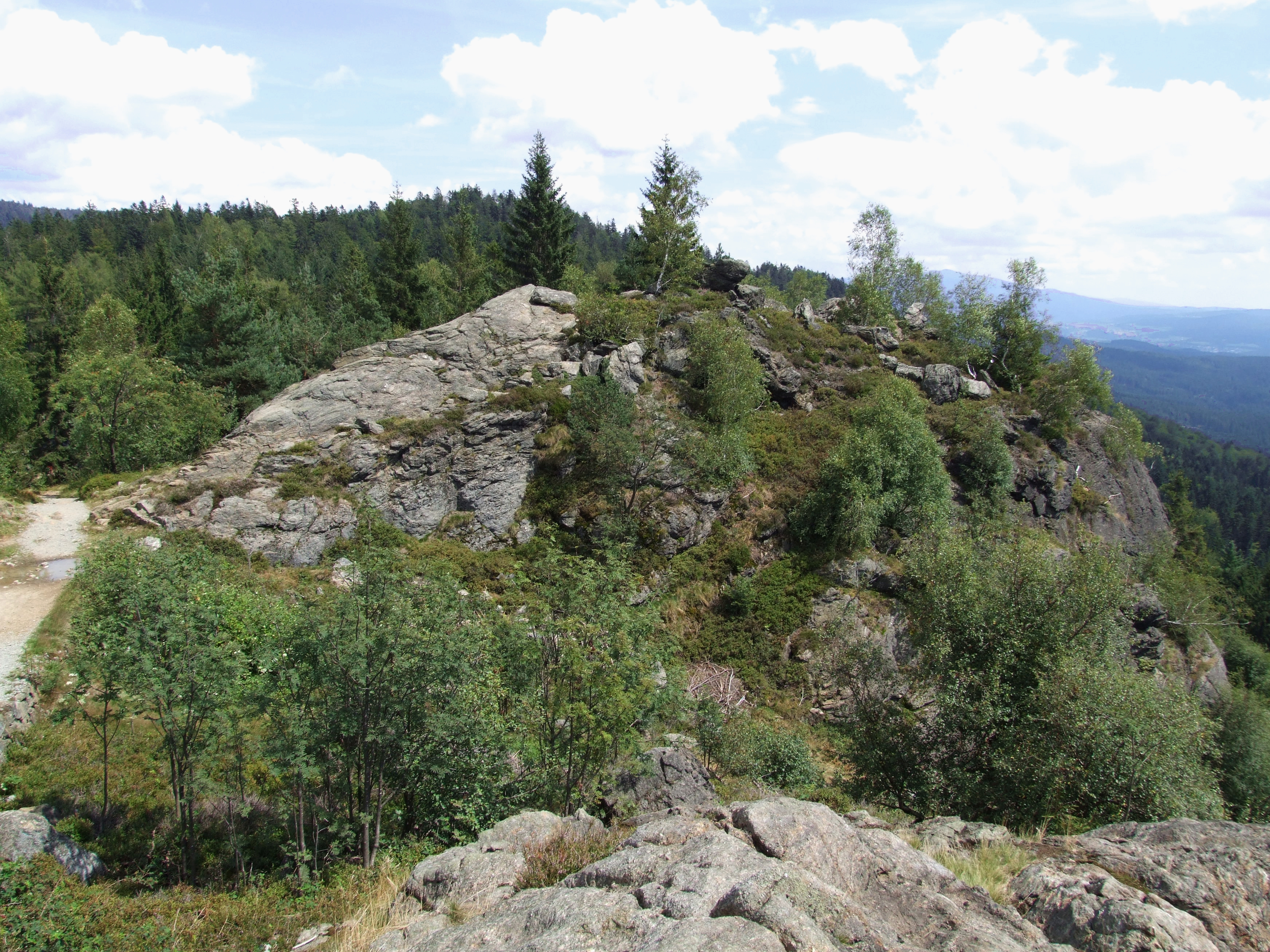
The eastern part of the summit massif

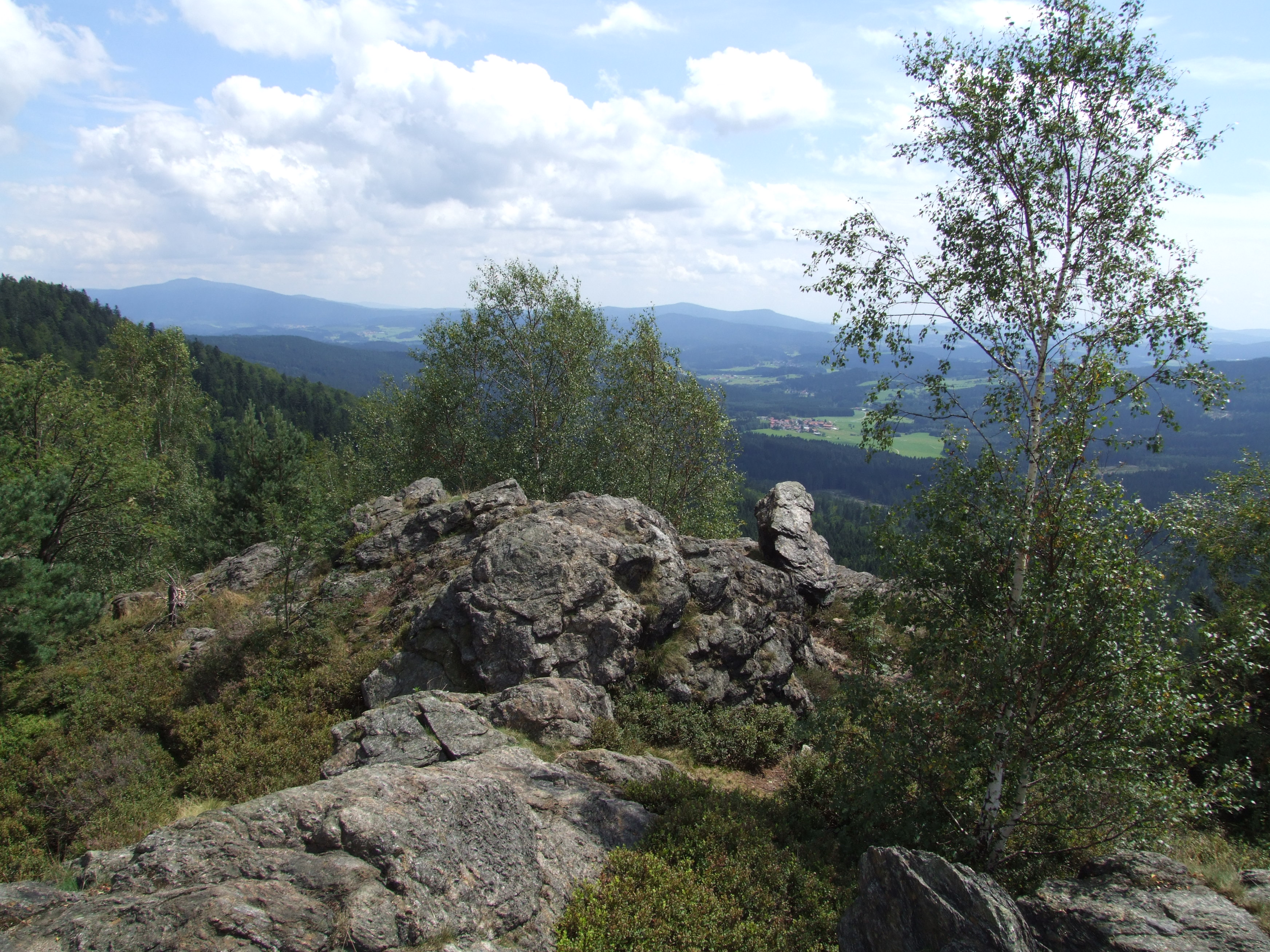
View from the southeast Silberberg

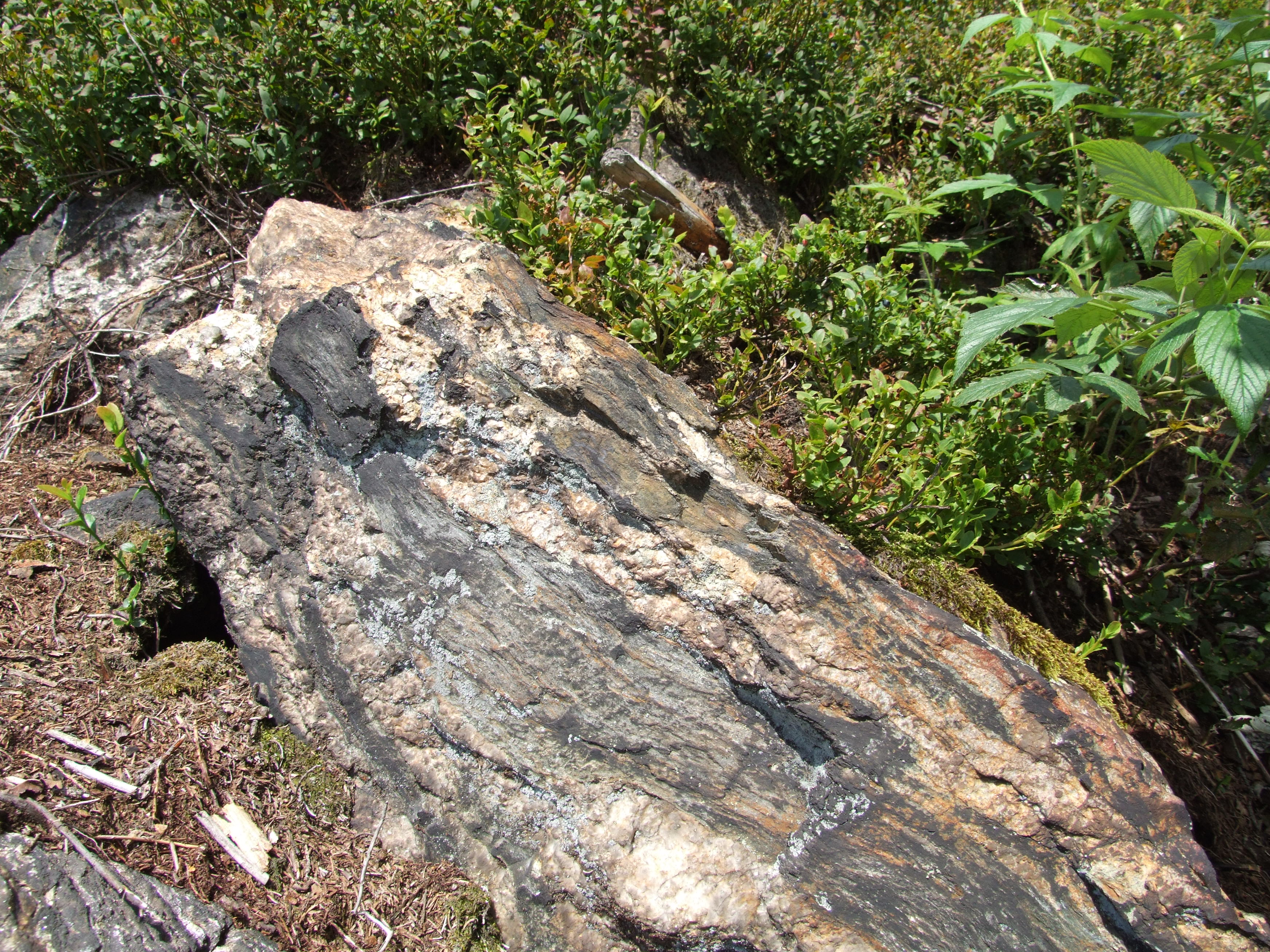
Minerals rich rocks on the steep south-facing slope

=== Minerals and ores from the Silberberg ===
Some of the 60 minerals of the Silberberg, in the museum room of the visitors' mine

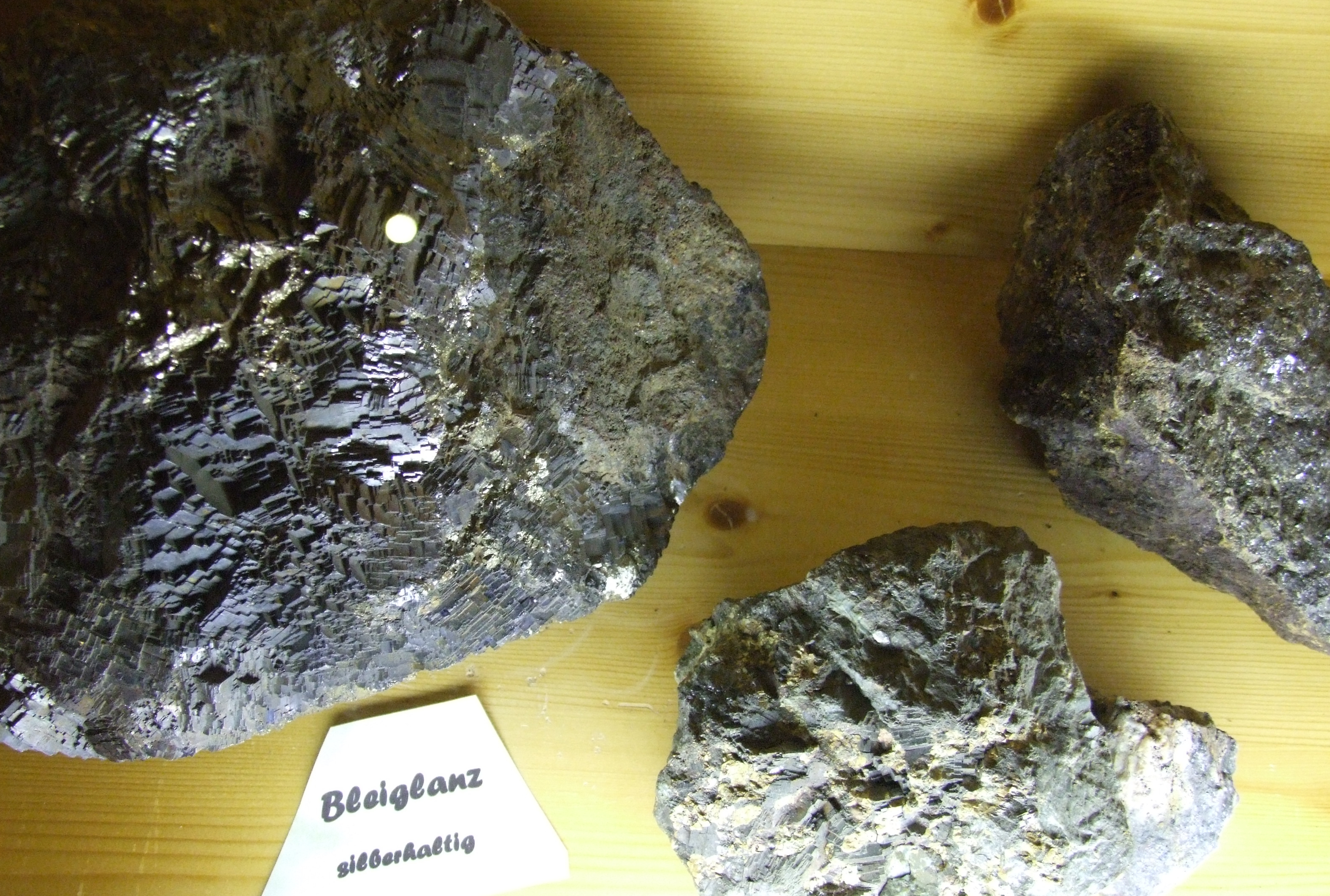
argentiferous galena

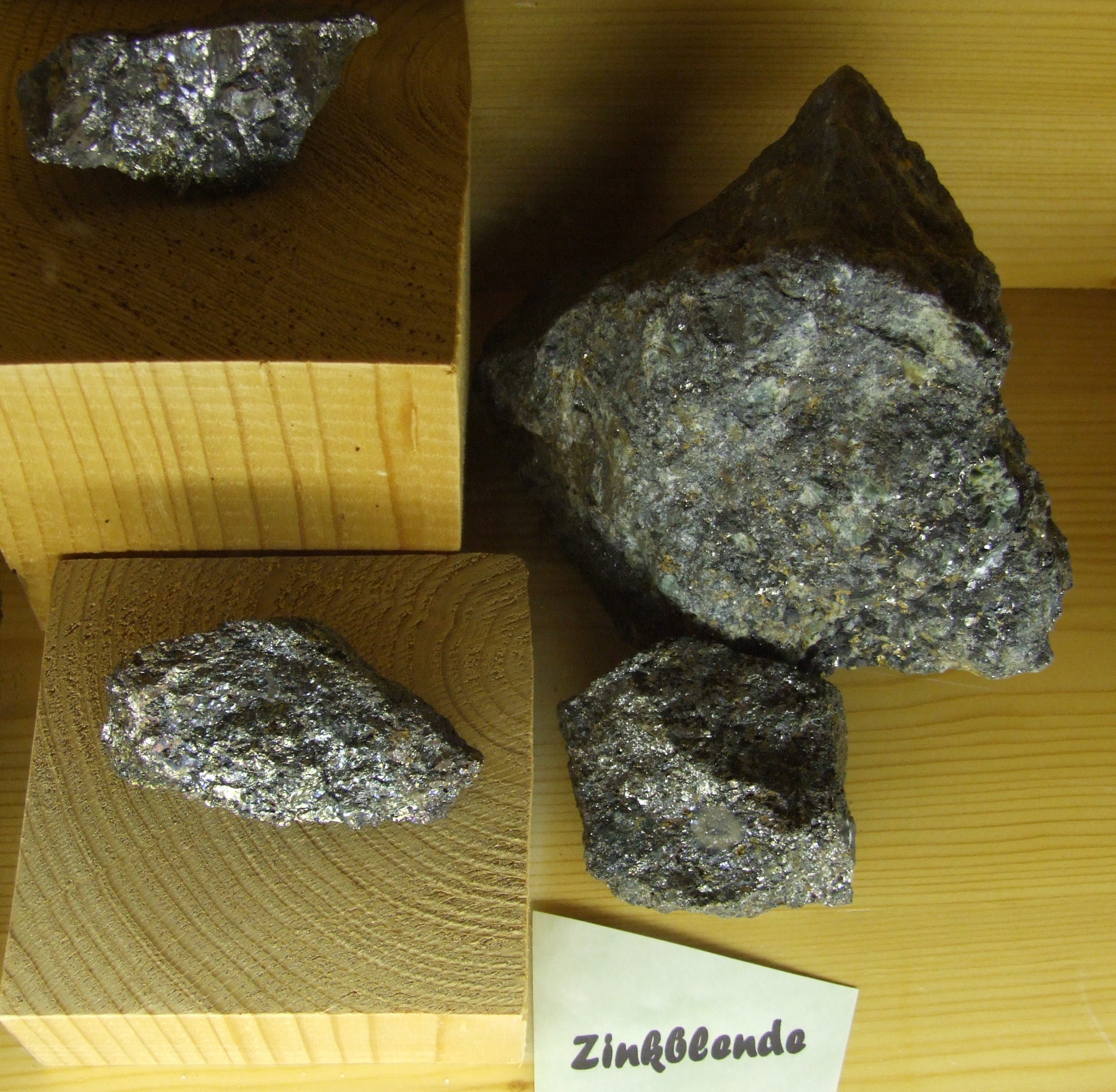
Zincblende

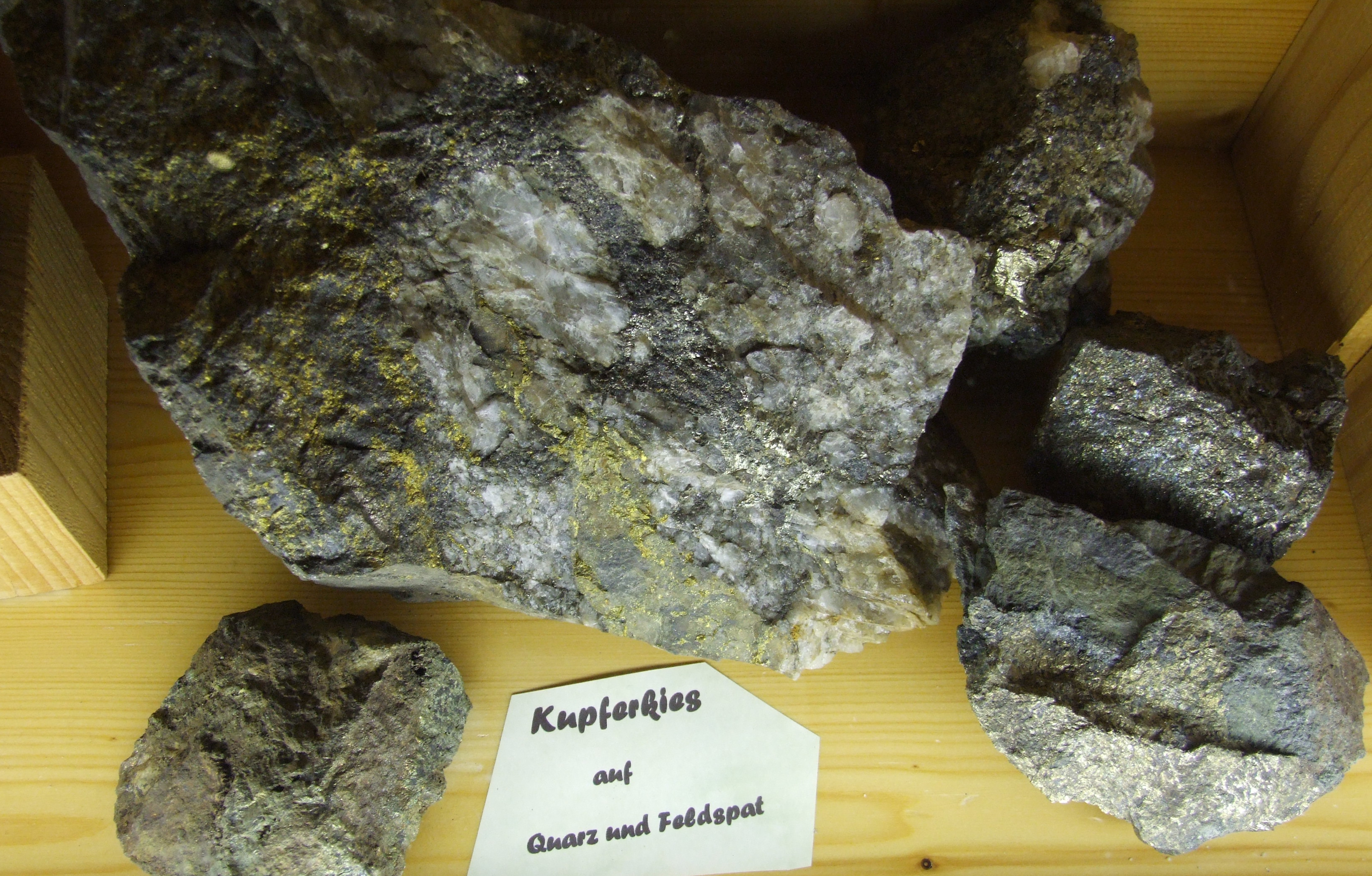
chalcopyrite on crystal and feldspar

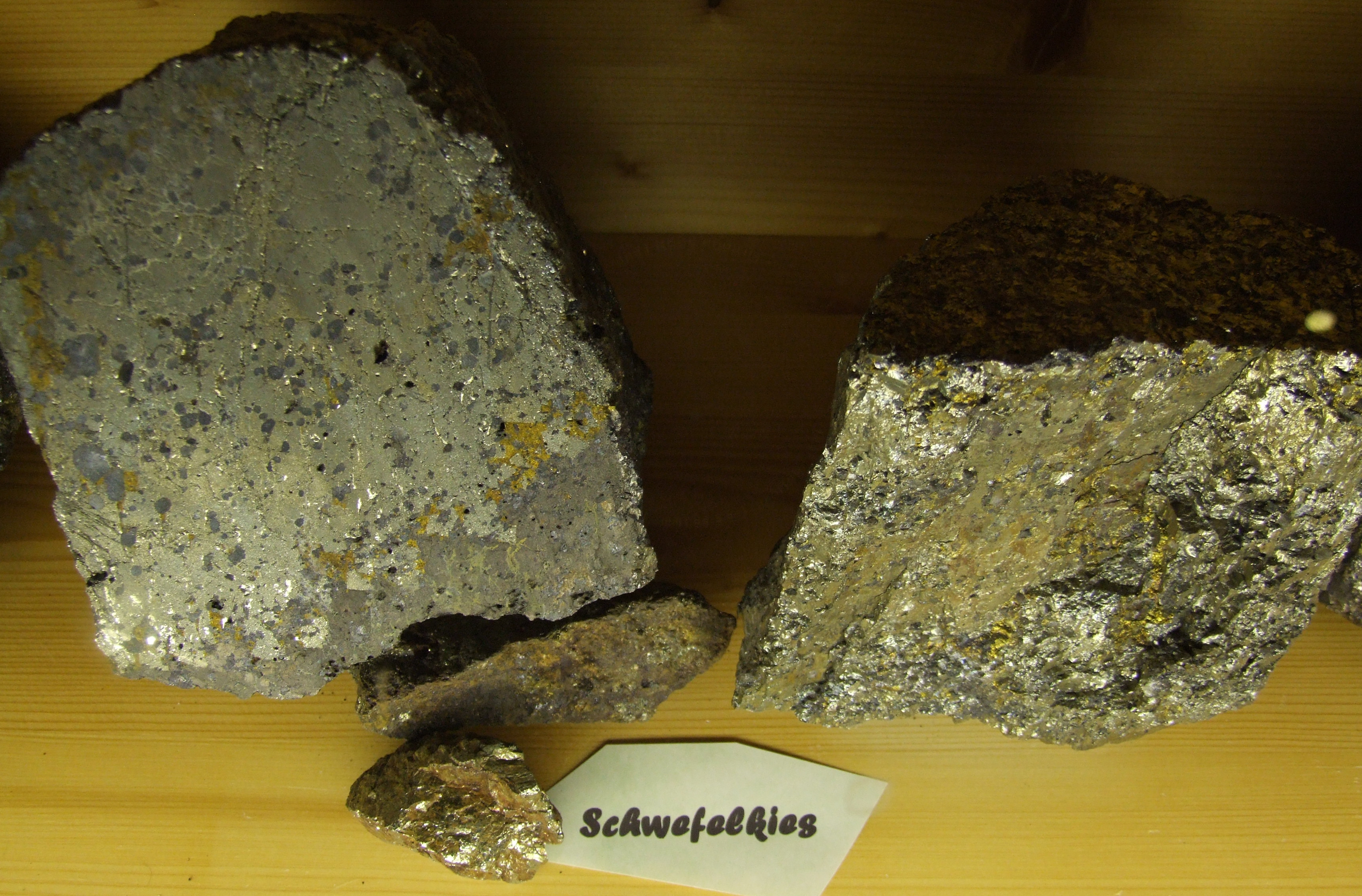
pyrite

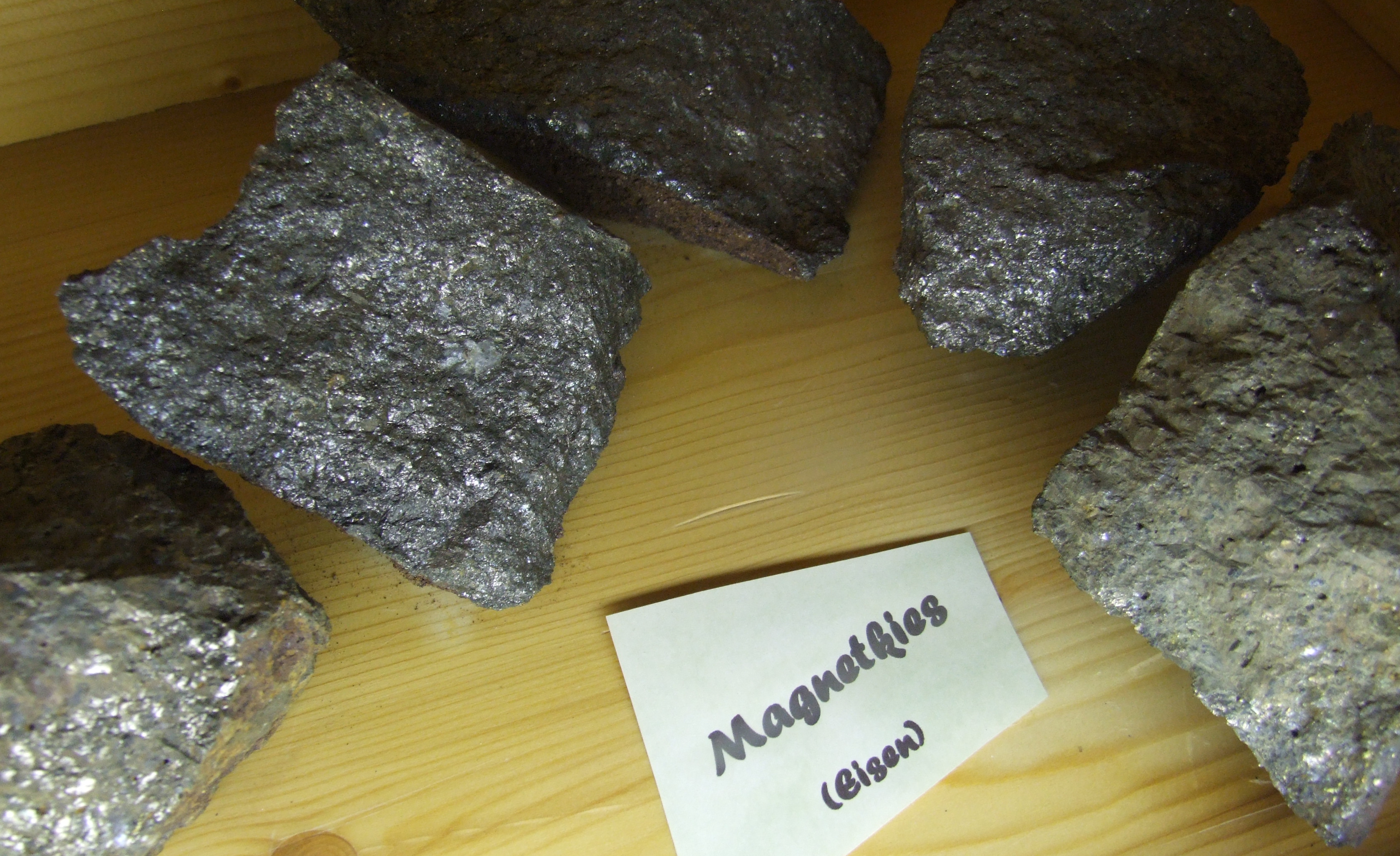
Pyrrhotite (iron)

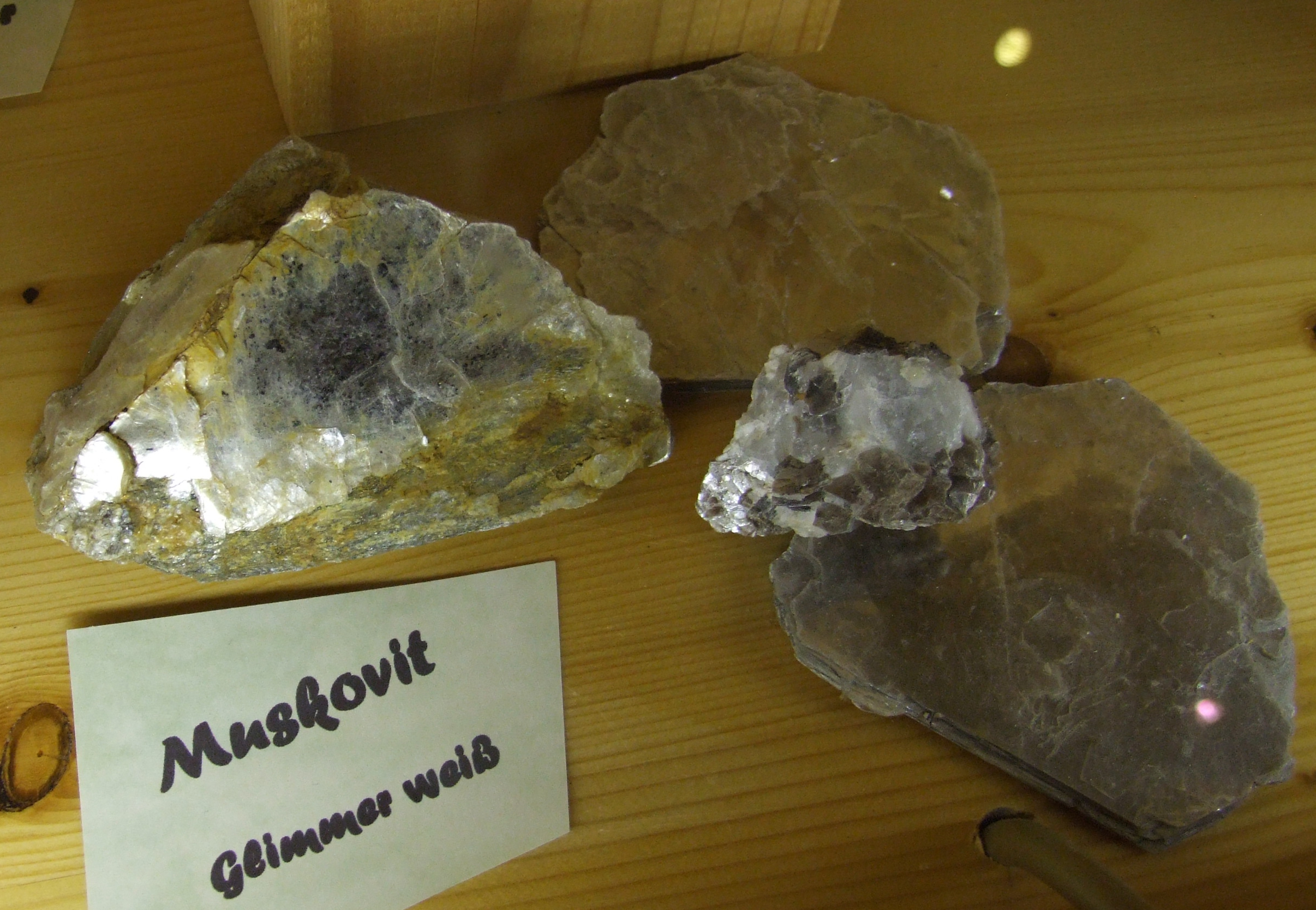
Muscovite

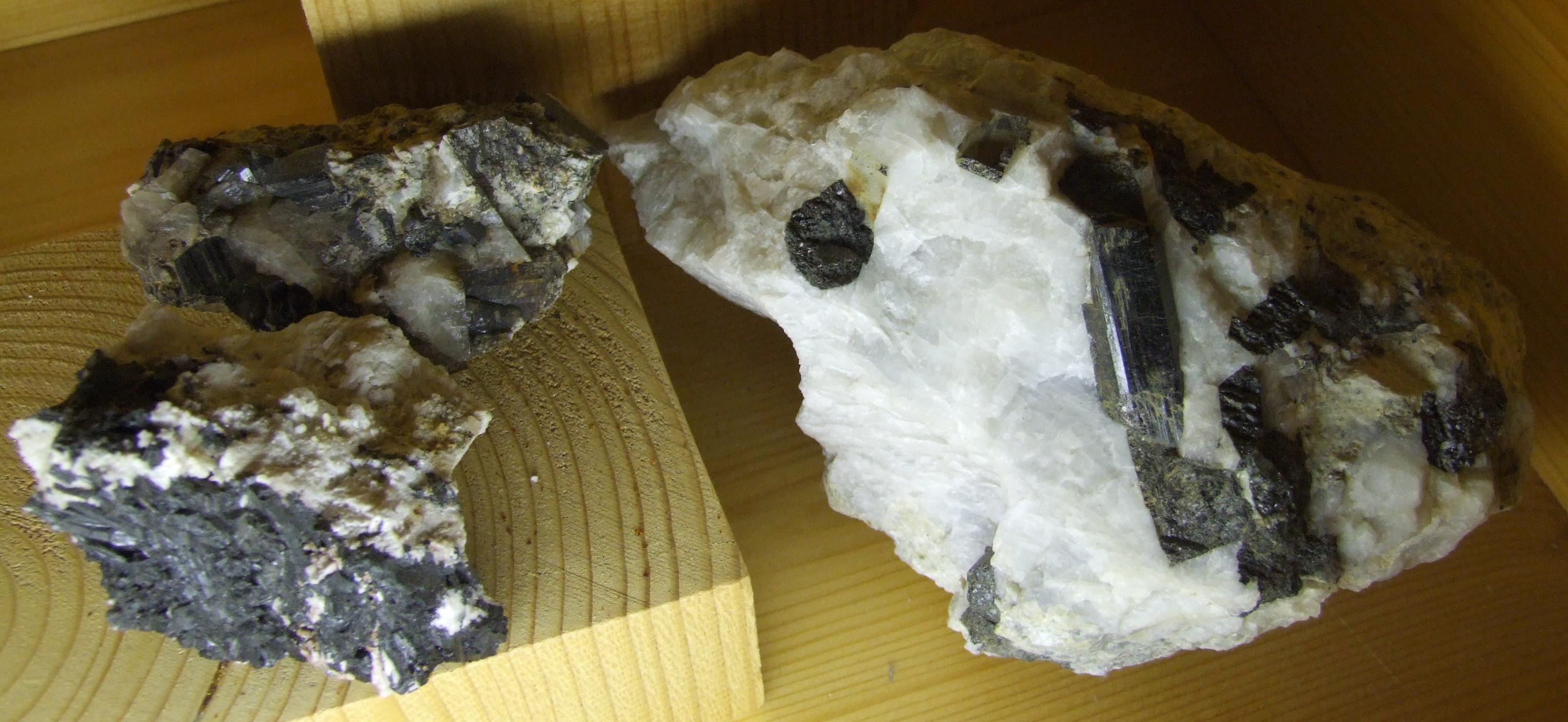
Tourmaline

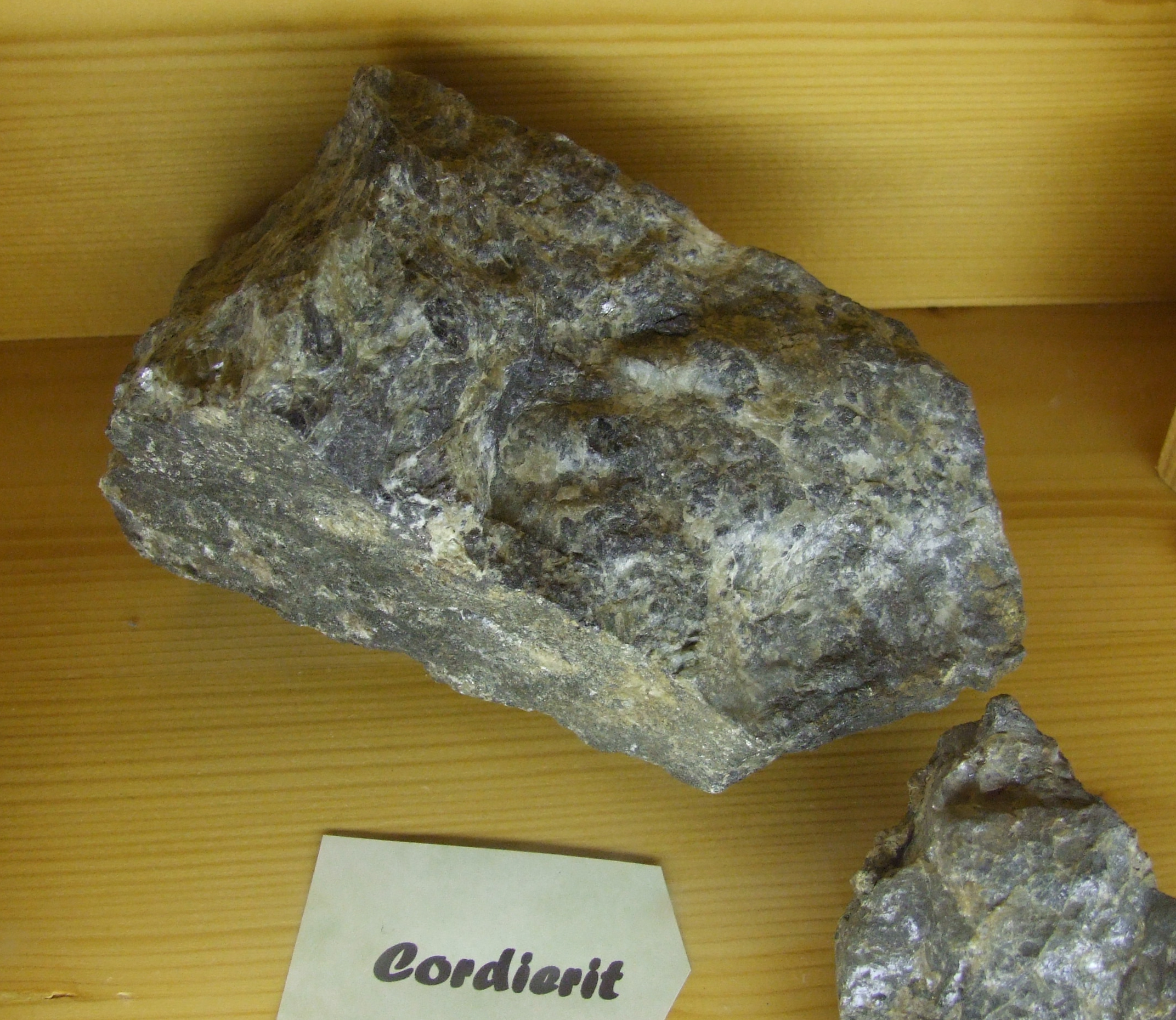
cordierite

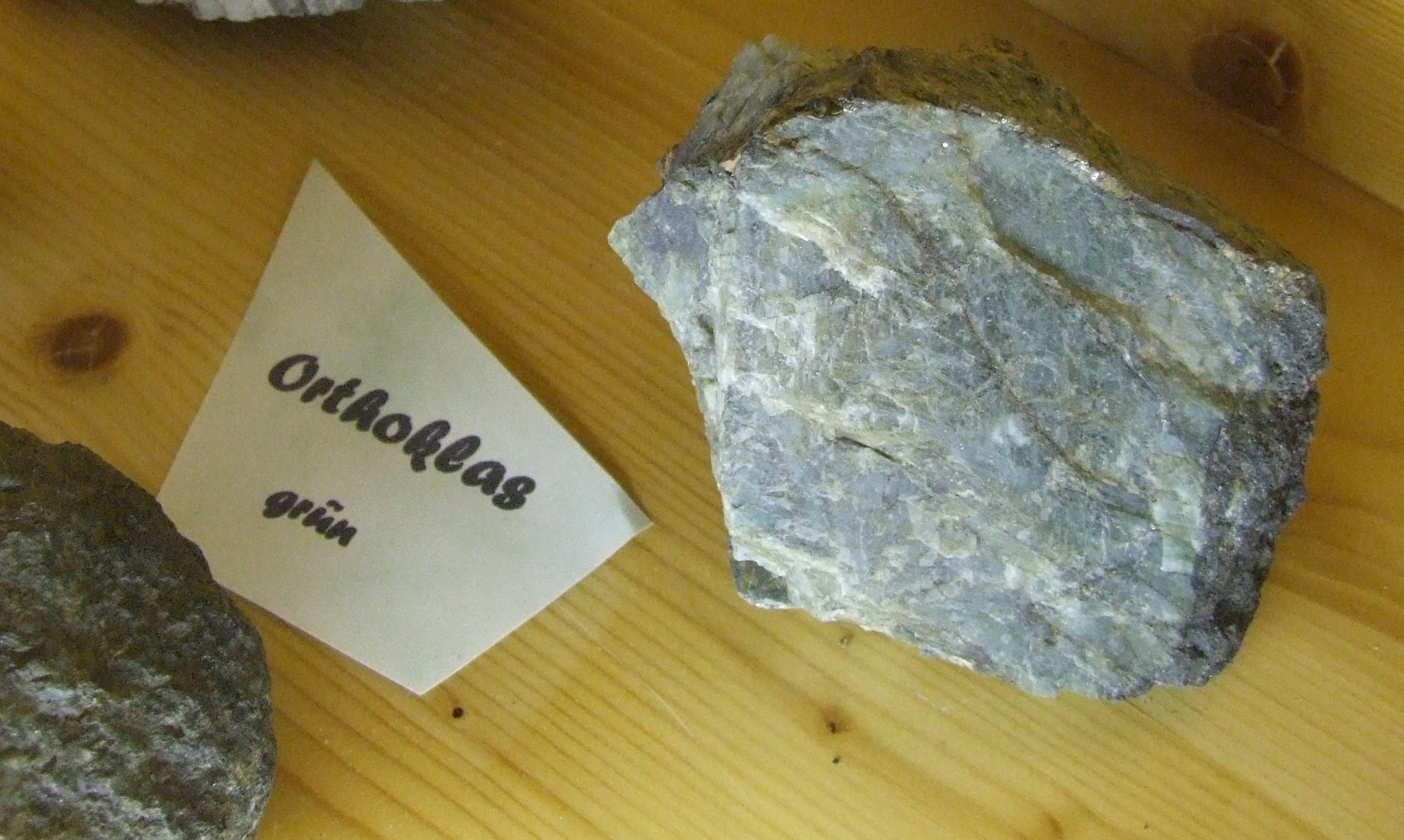
green Orthoclase

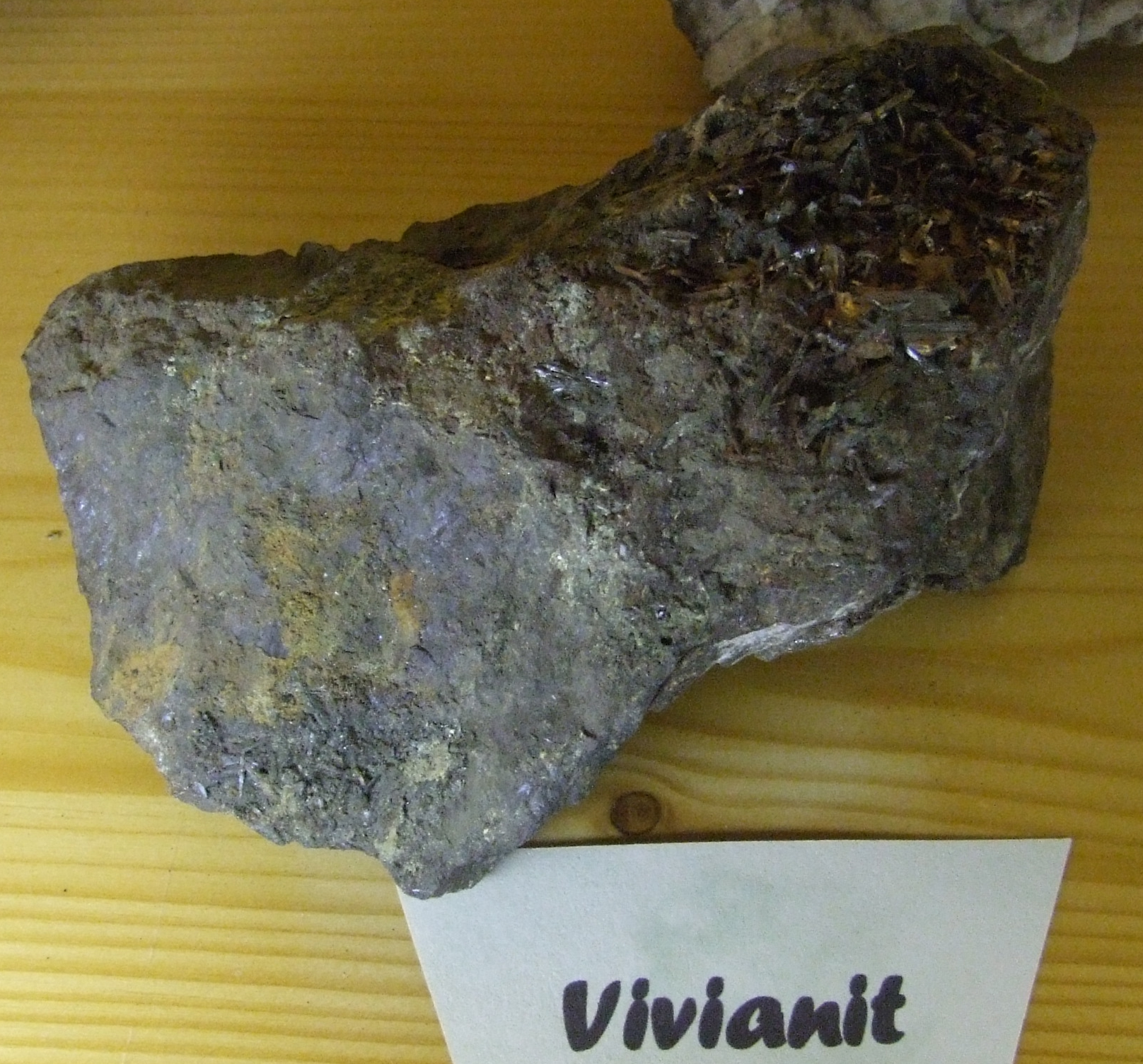
vivianite

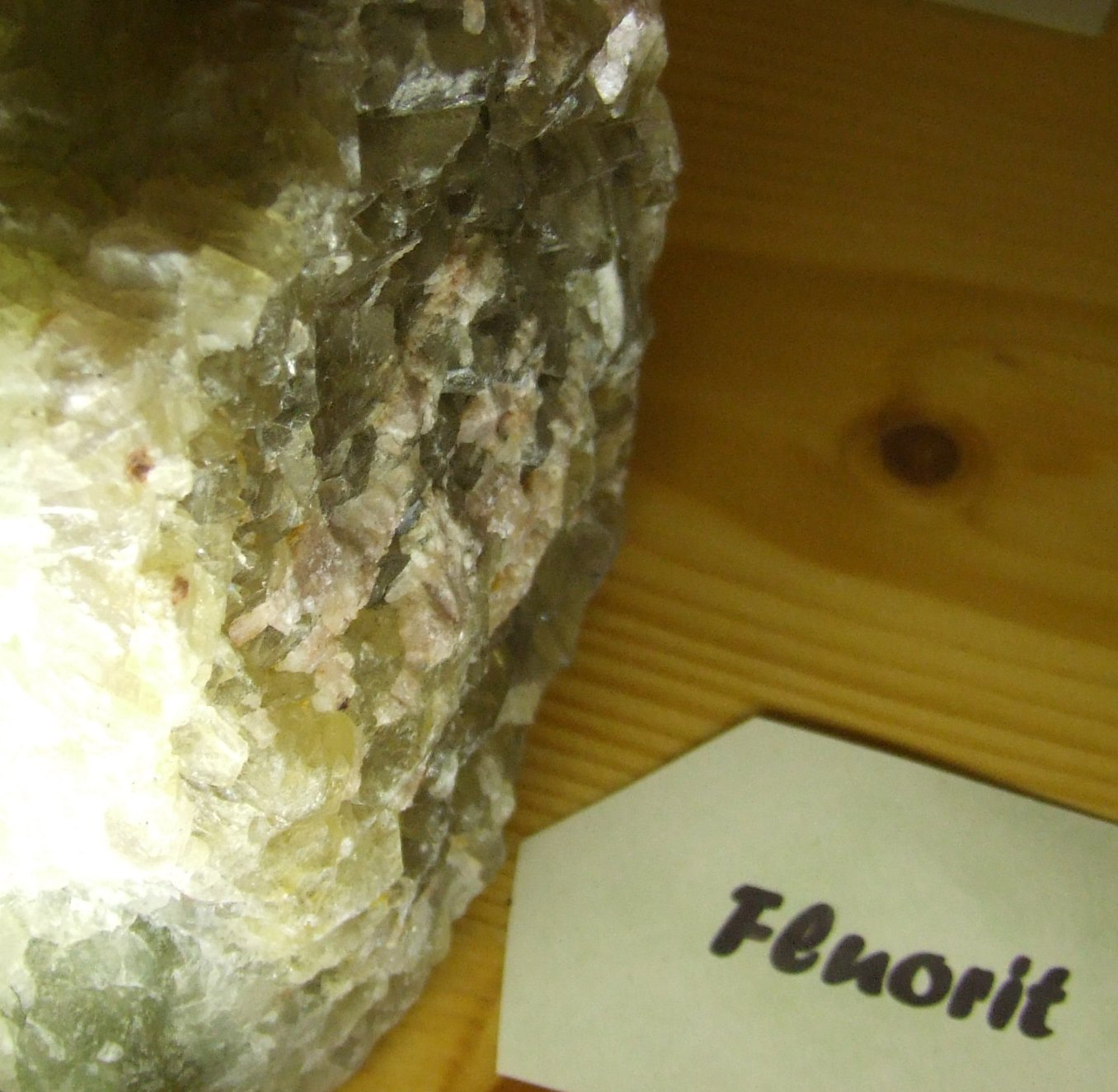
Fluorite

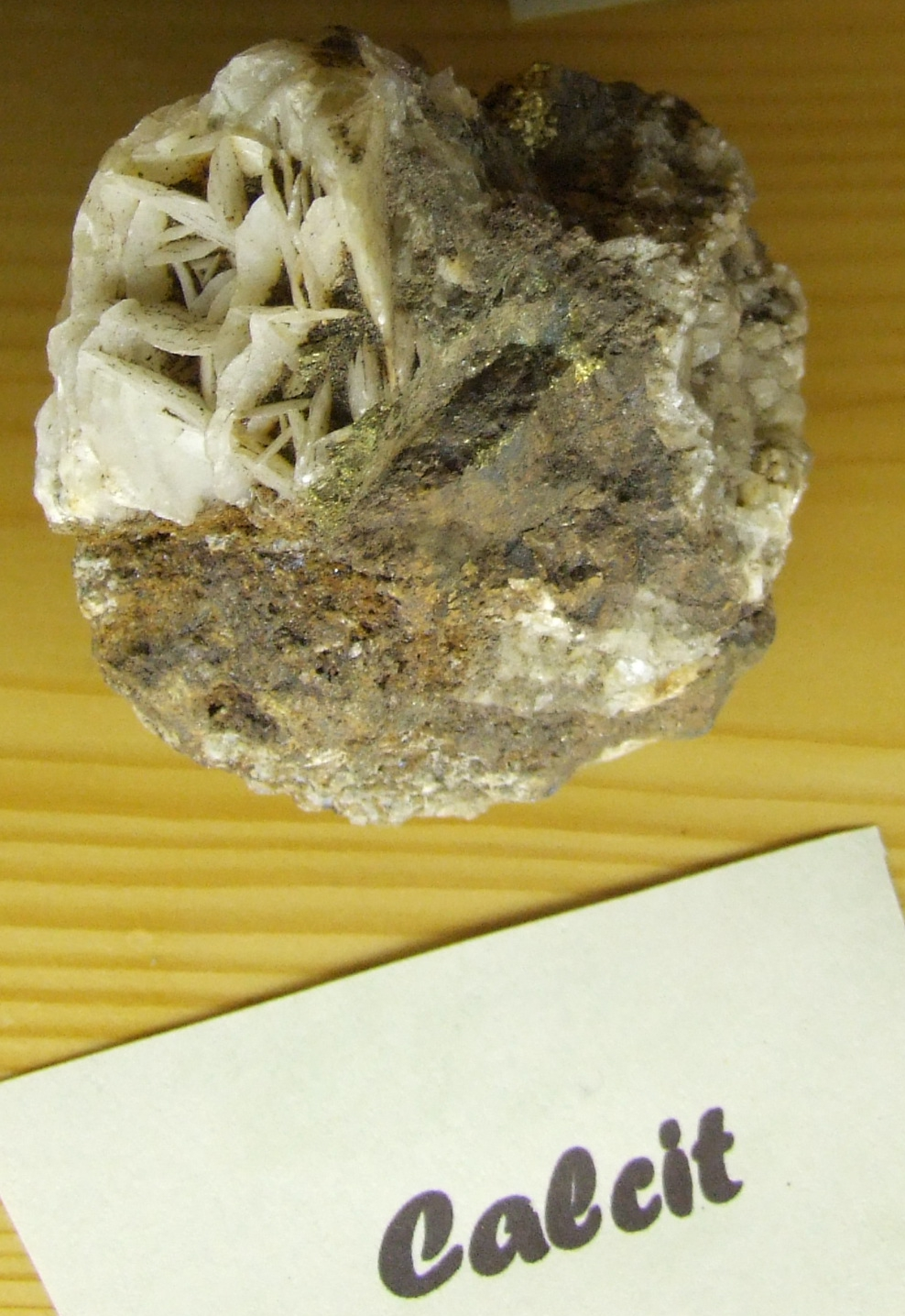
Calcite
