= Stela of Ashurnasirpal II =

Assyrian monolith

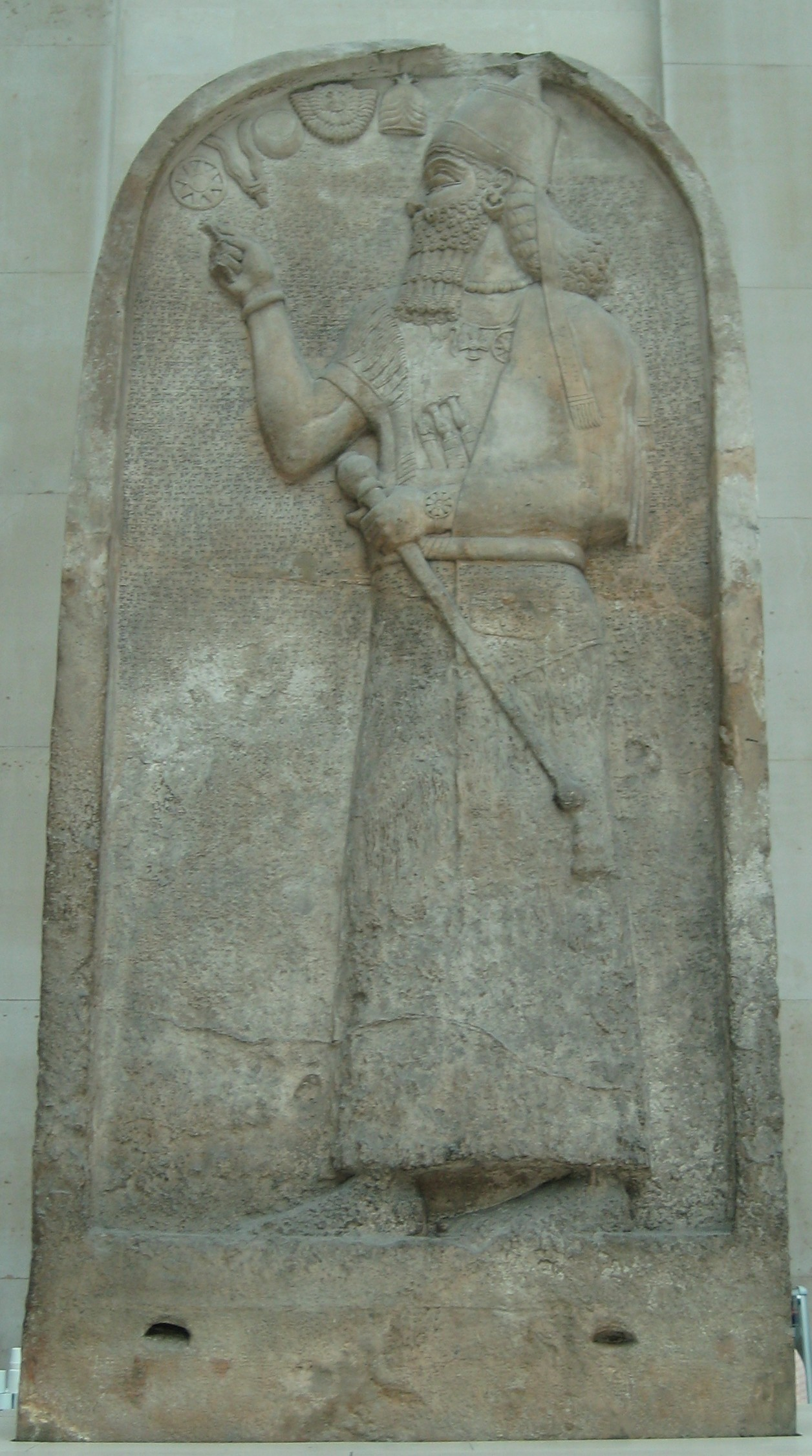
- The Stela of Ashurnasirpal II
- Material: Limestone
- Size: Height 294 cm, Weight c. 4 tonnes
- Created: 9th century BC
- Present location: British Museum, London
- Identification: ME 118805

The Stela of Ashurnasirpal II is an enormous Assyrian monolith that was erected during the reign of Ashurnasirpal II. The stela was discovered in the mid nineteenth century at the ancient site of Kalhu (now known as Nimrud) by the famous British archaeologist Austen Henry Layard. Dated to between 883–859 BC, the sculpture is now part of the British Museum's collection.

== Discovery ==
This stela was found by Layard in 1850 outside the Temple of Ninurta (the Assyrian god of hunting and warfare) at Nimrud. It was shipped to London the following year and gifted to the Museum by the Prince of Wales. For many years the stela was prominently displayed in the museum's Great Court.

== Description ==
The stela, which weighs over 4 tons and is 3 metres (9.8 ft) high, portrays the Assyrian King worshipping five gods. The monarch is shown wearing a conical hat and full beard, with his right hand extended snapping his fingers, and his left hand holding a mace, symbol of royal authority. The five deities are represented symbolically in the top left-hand corner of the stela: Ashur by a horned helmet, Shamash by a winged disk, Sin by a crescent, Adad by a forked line and Ishtar in the form of a star. A large amount of cuneiform text covers the stela, recording the king's military triumphs and conquests.

== Gallery ==
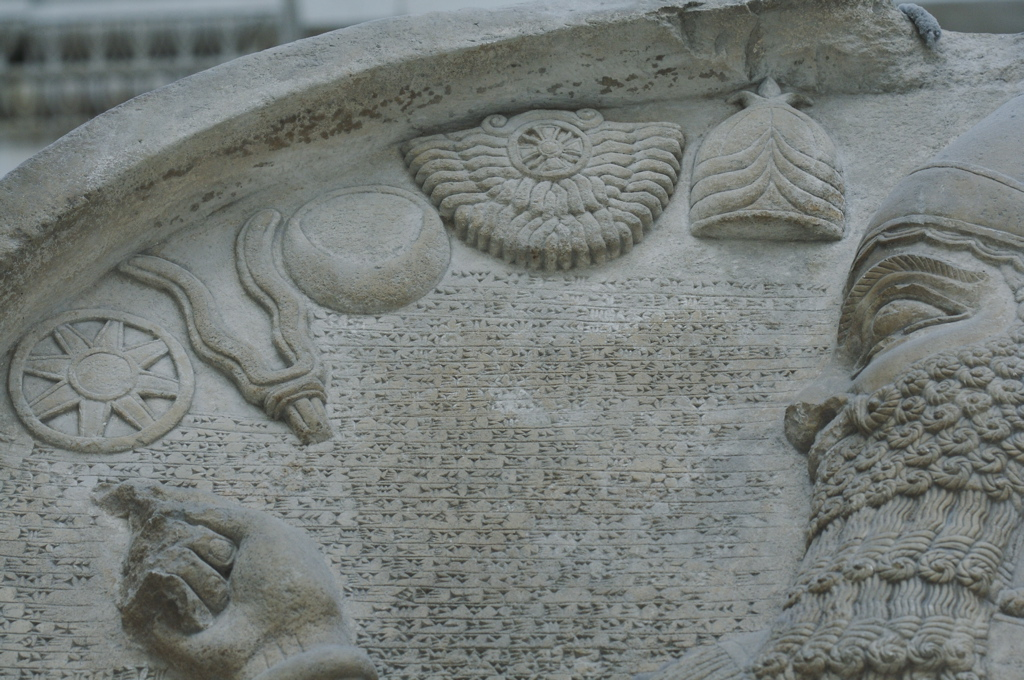
Detail of the stela, with symbols of the gods

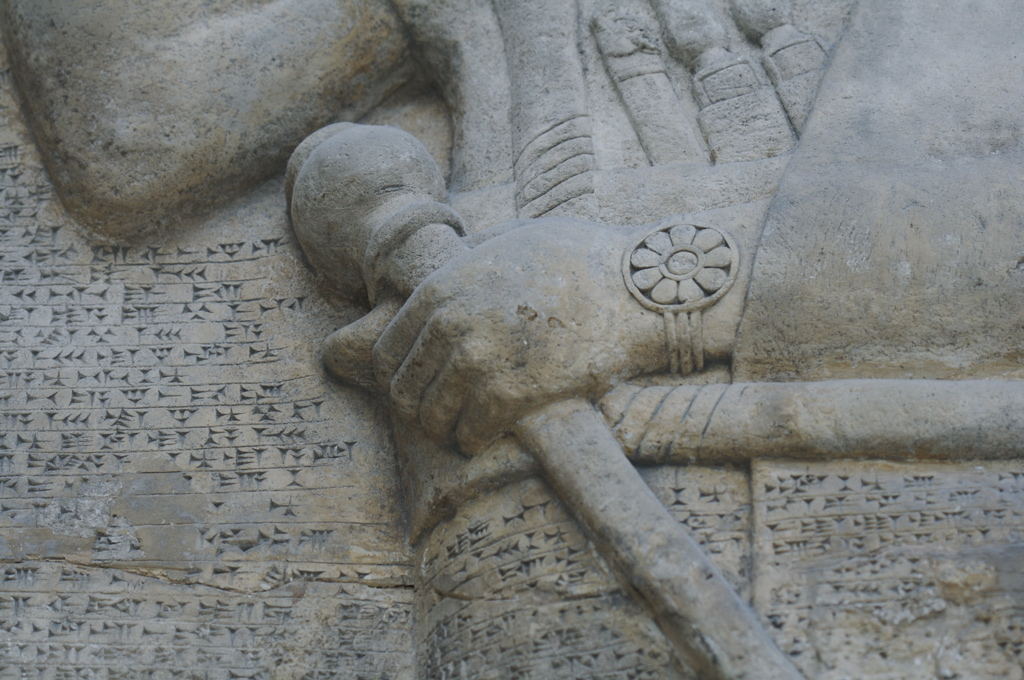
Close-up of the left hand holding the mace

== See also ==
- Statue of Ashurnasirpal II
- Kurkh Monoliths
- Stela of Shamshi-Adad V
