= Edward Prentis =

English genre painter (1797–1854)

Edward Prentis RBA (1797–1854) was an English genre painter. His scenes from contemporary domestic life were popular in his time.

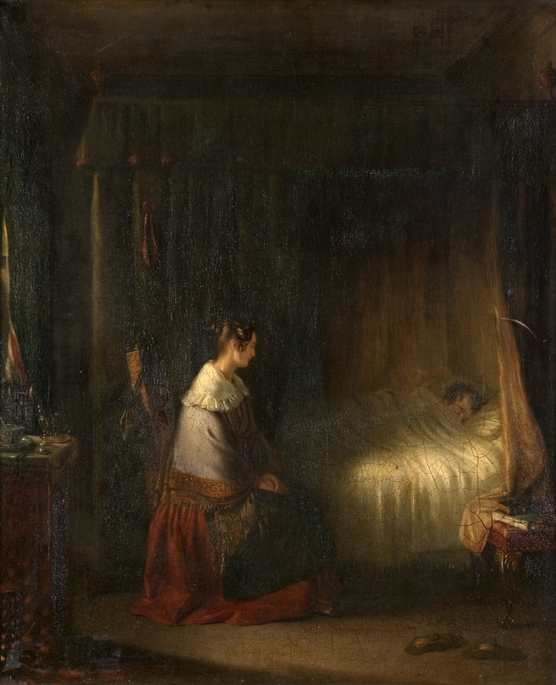
The Sick Bed (1836) by Edward Prentis

== Life ==
In 1825 Prentis contributed three pictures to the first exhibition of the Society of British Artists, of which, in the following year, he was elected a member. From that time he was a steady supporter of the society, and all his works were shown in the Suffolk Street gallery.

Prentis died in December 1854, leaving a widow and eleven children.

== Works ==
Prentis first exhibited in 1823, at the Royal Academy, sending A Girl with Matches and A Boy with Oranges. His works for the Society of British Artists included such subjects as The Profligate's Return from the Alehouse, 1829; Valentine's Eve, 1835; The Wife and The Daughter, 1836 (engraved, as a pair, by John Charles Bromley, 1837); and A Day's Pleasure, 1841 (engraved). The Folly of Extravagance, 1850, was the last picture he exhibited.

Prentis also executed for the British Museum a series of drawings of the ivory objects and bronze bowls found at Nimrud. Some were engraved on wood by John Thompson, and published in Austen Henry Layard's Monuments of Nineveh (1849). He donated some Old Master drawings to the museum.

== Notes ==
Attribution

This article incorporates text from a publication now in the public domain: Lee, Sidney, ed. (1896). "Prentis, Edward". Dictionary of National Biography. Vol. 46. London: Smith, Elder & Co.
