= Latilla =

In architecture, a latilla is a lath used in traditional adobe construction (see viga).

Latilla may also refer to

- Eugenio Latilla (1808–1861), Anglo-Italian painter
- Gaetano Latilla (1711–1788), Italian opera composer
- Gino Latilla (1924–2011), Italian singer
