= Stela of Shamshi-Adad V =

Assyrian monolith

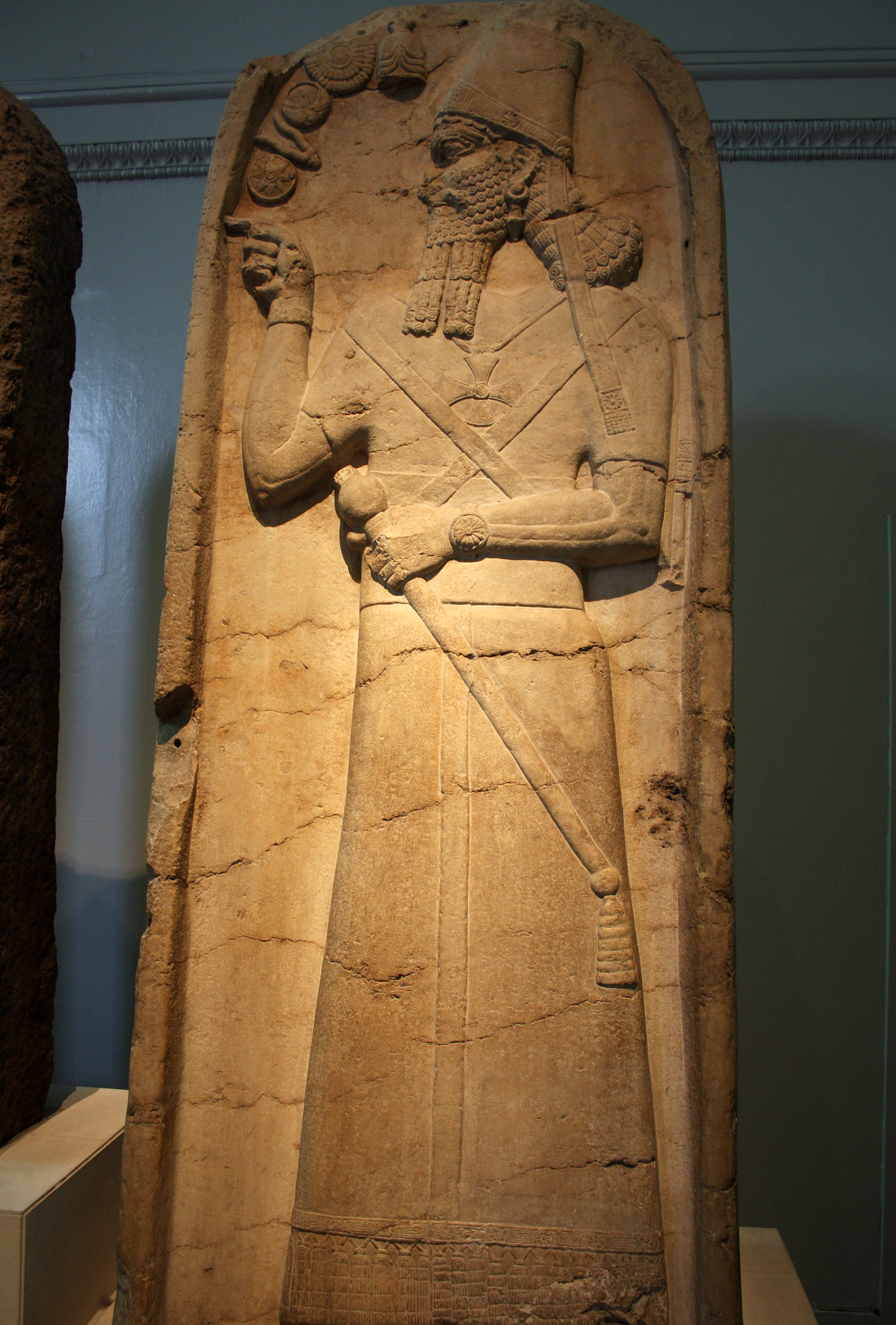
- The Stela of Shamshi-Adad V
- Material: Limestone
- Size: Height 195.2 cm, Width 92.5 cm
- Created: 9th century BC
- Present location: British Museum, London
- Identification: ME 118892

The Stela of Shamshi-Adad V is a large Assyrian monolith erected during the reign of Shamshi-Adad V. The stela was discovered in the mid nineteenth century at the ancient site of Kalhu (now known as Nimrud) by the British archaeologist Hormuzd Rassam. Dated to between 824–811 BC, the sculpture is now part of the British Museum's collection.

== Discovery ==
This stela was found by Rassam in 1855 near the Temple of Nabu at Nimrud. It was shipped to London the following year to become part of the British Museum's Assyrian collection, where it is displayed alongside the Kurkh Monoliths and adjacent to the Black Obelisk of Shalmaneser III and the White Obelisk of Ashurnasirpal I.

== Description ==
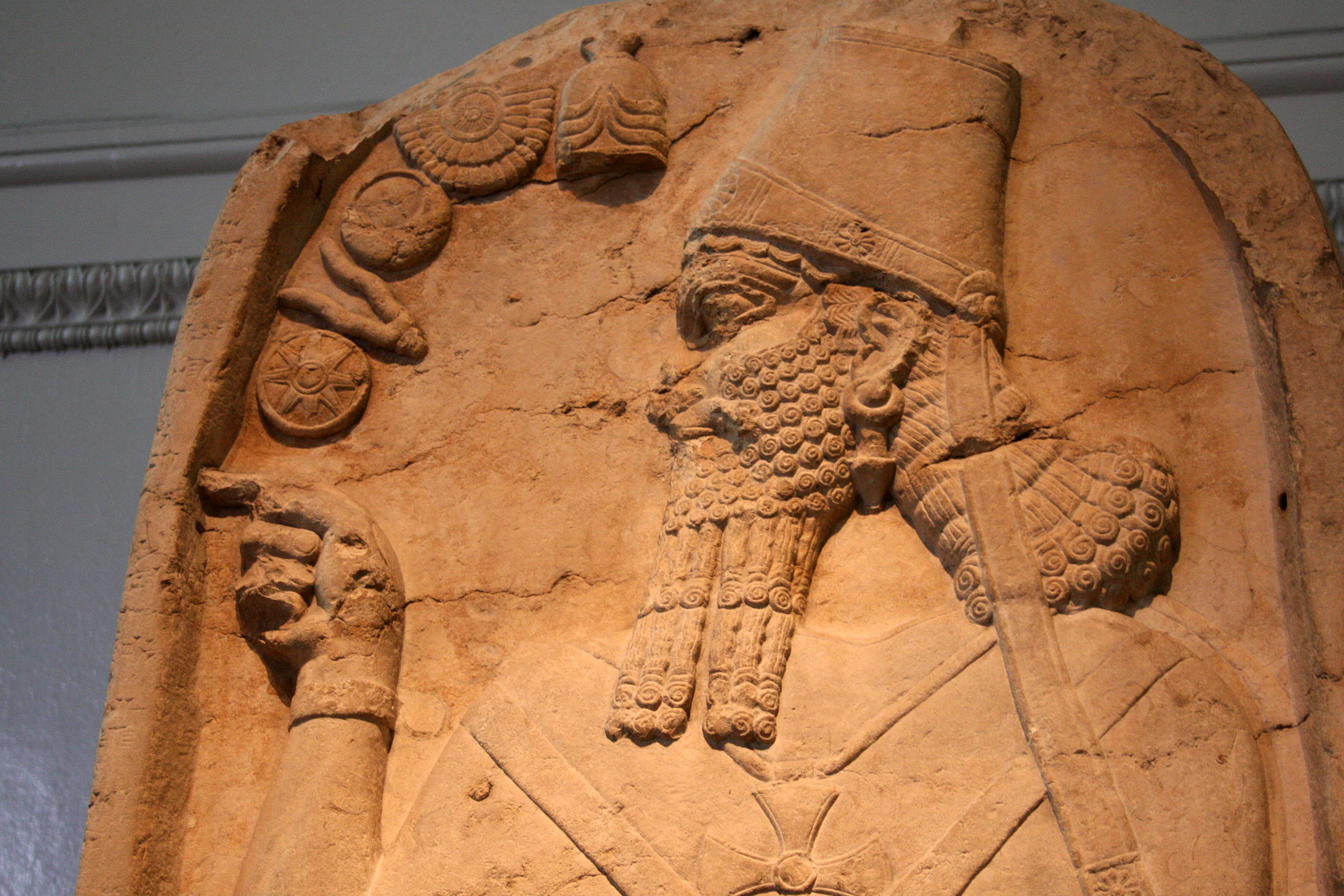
Detail of the stela, with symbols of the gods

The stela portrays the Assyrian King worshipping five gods in a format very similar to the Stela of Ashurnasirpal II. The monarch is shown wearing a conical hat and full beard in archaic style, with his right hand extended snapping his fingers, and his left hand holding a mace, symbol of royal authority. The five deities are represented symbolically in the top left hand corner of the stela: Ashur by a horned helmet, Shamash by a winged disk, Sin by a crescent, Adad by a forked line and Ishtar in the form of a star. A large amount of cuneiform text written in an earlier, obsolete style covers the sides of the stela, recording the king's military campaigns.
