= Numaniyah, Al-Hamdaniya =

Numaniyah
- Village
- Location in Iraq
- Coordinates: 36.09325°N 43.31962°E
- Country: Iraq
- Governorate: Nineveh Governorate
- District: Al-Hamdaniya District

Numaniyah (Arabic: النعمانية) is a village in the Nineveh Governorate, Iraq. It is located near the ruins of the city of Nimrud in the Al-Hamdaniya District in the Nineveh Plains.

== History ==
Numaniyah came under the occupation of the Islamic State of Iraq and the Levant (ISIL) during its campaign in August 2014, but was later retaken by the 9th division of the Iraqi army on 13 November 2016 amidst the battle of Mosul. The Iraqi army subsequently set about clearing the village of mines and bombs planted by ISIL.
