= Resen (Bible) =

Resen was, according to Genesis 10:8–12, a city founded by Nimrod, son of Cush in the land of Assyria as interpreted in most modern translations.

Resen is stated, according to Genesis 10:12, to have been located between Nineveh and Calah and became a great city. Its exact location is today unclear. According to Genesis, it is within the vicinity of ancient Assyria, which should place it in Iraq, but the exact location is not known. Some have identified it with the ruins of Yassin tepe and others with Karamles.

== Controversies ==
The differences between translations and the claims of historical literature have produced difficulties.

From Genesis chapter 10:11-12 KJV:

“Out of that land went forth Asshur, and builded Nineveh, and the city Rehoboth, and Calah, And Resen between Nineveh and Calah: the same is a great city.

From the Book of Jubilees

"And for Ashur came forth the second Portion, all the land of Ashur and Nineveh and Shinar and to the border of India, and it ascends and skirts the river."

From the Antiquities of the Jews

"Ashur lived at the city of Nineveh; and named his subjects Assyrians, who became the most fortunate nation, beyond others" (Antiquities, i, vi, 4).

Some believe that Flavius Josephus mentioning Ashur dwelling at Nineveh would make it impossible for Nimrod to have built the city. However, this does not preclude some cooperation between them.

== See also ==
- Nimrud
