= Royal Society of British Artists =

British art body established in 1823

The Royal Society of British Artists
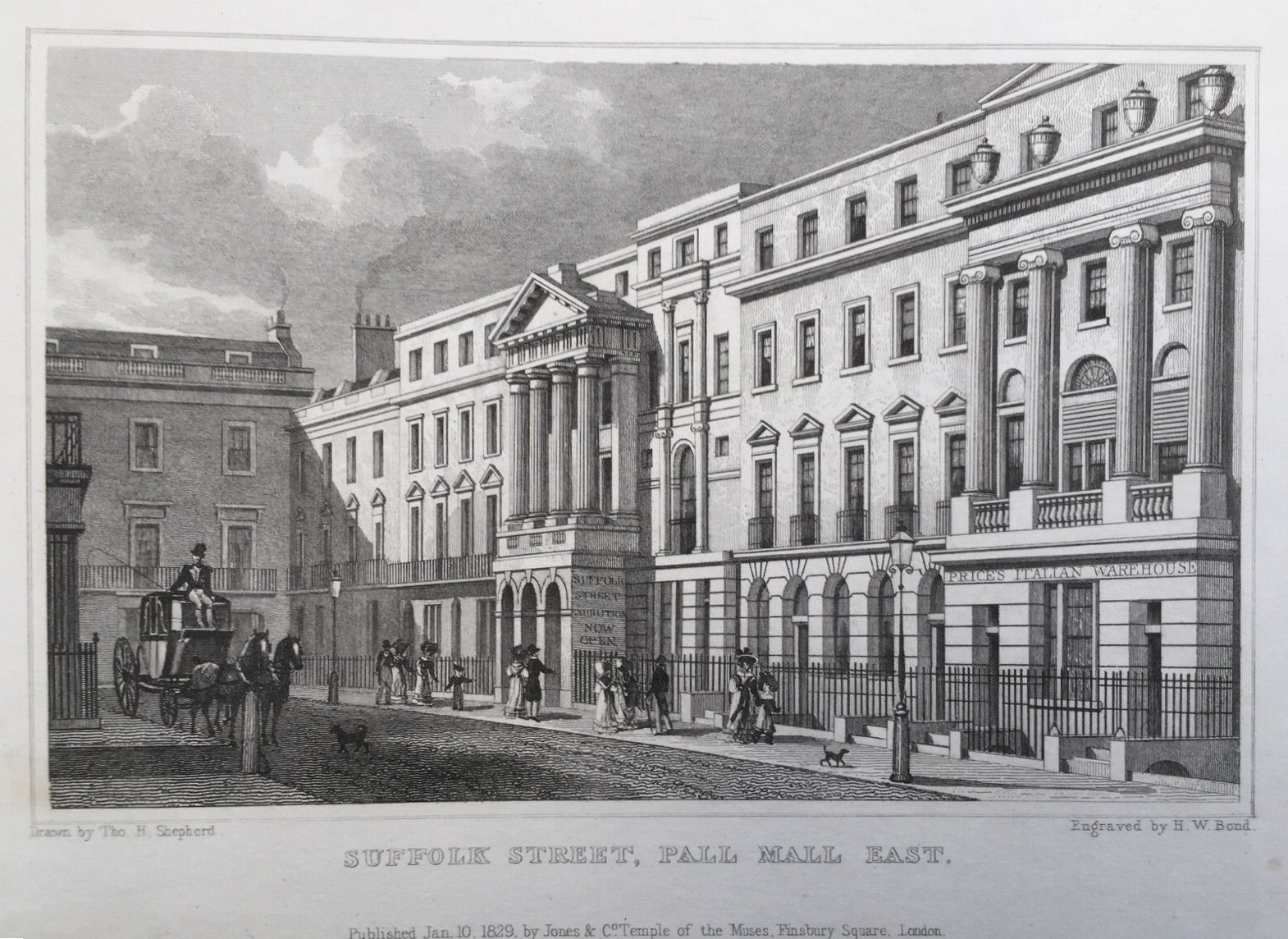
- Abbreviation: RBA
- Formation: 1823; 203 years ago
- Type: Artist Society
- Legal status: Active
- Members: 85
- Official language: English
- President: Michael Harrison PRBA Hon RBSA
- Vice President: Henry Jabbour VPRBA
- Affiliations: Federation of British Artists
- Website: www.therba.org
- Remarks: References

The Royal Society of British Artists (RBA) is a British art body established in 1823 as the Society of British Artists, as an alternative to the Royal Academy.

== History ==
The RBA commenced with twenty-seven members, and took until 1876 to reach fifty. Artists wishing to resign were required to give three months' notice and pay a fine of £100. The RBA's first two exhibitions were held in 1824, with one or two exhibitions held annually thereafter. For much of the 19th century these were held at large premises on Suffolk Street, Pall Mall (no. 6 1/2) often referred to as the Suffolk Street Gallery (or Galleries) in Victorian sources.

The RBA currently has 85 elected members who participate in an annual exhibition held at the Mall Galleries in London. The Society's previous gallery was a building designed by John Nash in Suffolk Street. Queen Victoria granted the Society the Royal Charter in 1887.

It is one of the nine member societies that form the Federation of British Artists which administers the Mall Galleries, next to Trafalgar Square.

Its records from 1823 to 1985 are in the Victoria and Albert Museum.

== Prominent members ==
- Adrian Allinson
- Wright Barker
- John Noble Barlow
- Wyke Bayliss
- Edmund Blampied
- Henry John Boddington
- Estella Canziani
- David Carpanini
- Albert Henry Collings
- Richard P. Cook
- Wynford Dewhurst
- Bernard Walter Evans
- Frances C. Fairman
- Edward Arthur Fellowes Prynne
- Benjamin Haughton
- Ralph Hedley
- William Hemsley
- James John Hill
- Henry George Hoyland
- Ernest Borough Johnson (1866–1949)
- Lucy Kemp-Welch
- Hayley Lever
- Laurence Stephen Lowry
- Arthur Hardwick Marsh
- Gustav Pope
- Cyril Power
- Lewis Charles Powles
- Frederick Cayley Robinson
- Stanley Royle
- Edward Seago
- Frank Southgate (1872–1916)
- Frank Swinstead
- Barbara Tate
- James Whistler
- Christopher Williams
- John Yale

== Presidents ==
- 1824 Thomas Heaphy
- 1825 TC Hofland
- 1826 John Glover
- 1827 J Wilson
- 1828 Henry Hoppner Meyer
- 1829 Clarkson Stanfield
- 1830 James Holmes
- 1831 David Roberts
- 1832 Richard Barrett Davis
- 1833 George Stevens
- 1834 Elias Childe
- 1835 Edward Prentis
- 1836 Frederick Yeates Hurlstone
- 1837 William Linton
- 1838 Joseph William Allen
- 1839 George Maddox
- 1840 Eugenio Latilla
- 1841 Frederick Yeates Hurlstone
- 1870 Alfred Clint
- 1881 John Burr
- 1886 James McNeill Whistler
- 1888 Sir Wyke Bayliss
- 1906 Sir Alfred East
- 1913 Sir Frank Brangwyn
- 1919 Solomon Joseph Solomon
- 1928 Walter Richard Sickert
- 1930 Philip de László
- 1931 Bertram Nicholls
- 1947 John Copley
- 1950 Hesketh Hubbard
- 1956 Edward Halliday
- 1974 Peter Greenham
- 1982 Peter Garrard
- 1987 Tom Coates
- 1993 Colin Hayes
- 1998 Cav. Romeo Di Girolamo
- 2009 James Horton
- 2017 Nick Tidnam
- 2019 Mick Davies
- 2024 Michael Harrison
