= Statue of Ashurnasirpal II =

Assyrian sculpture

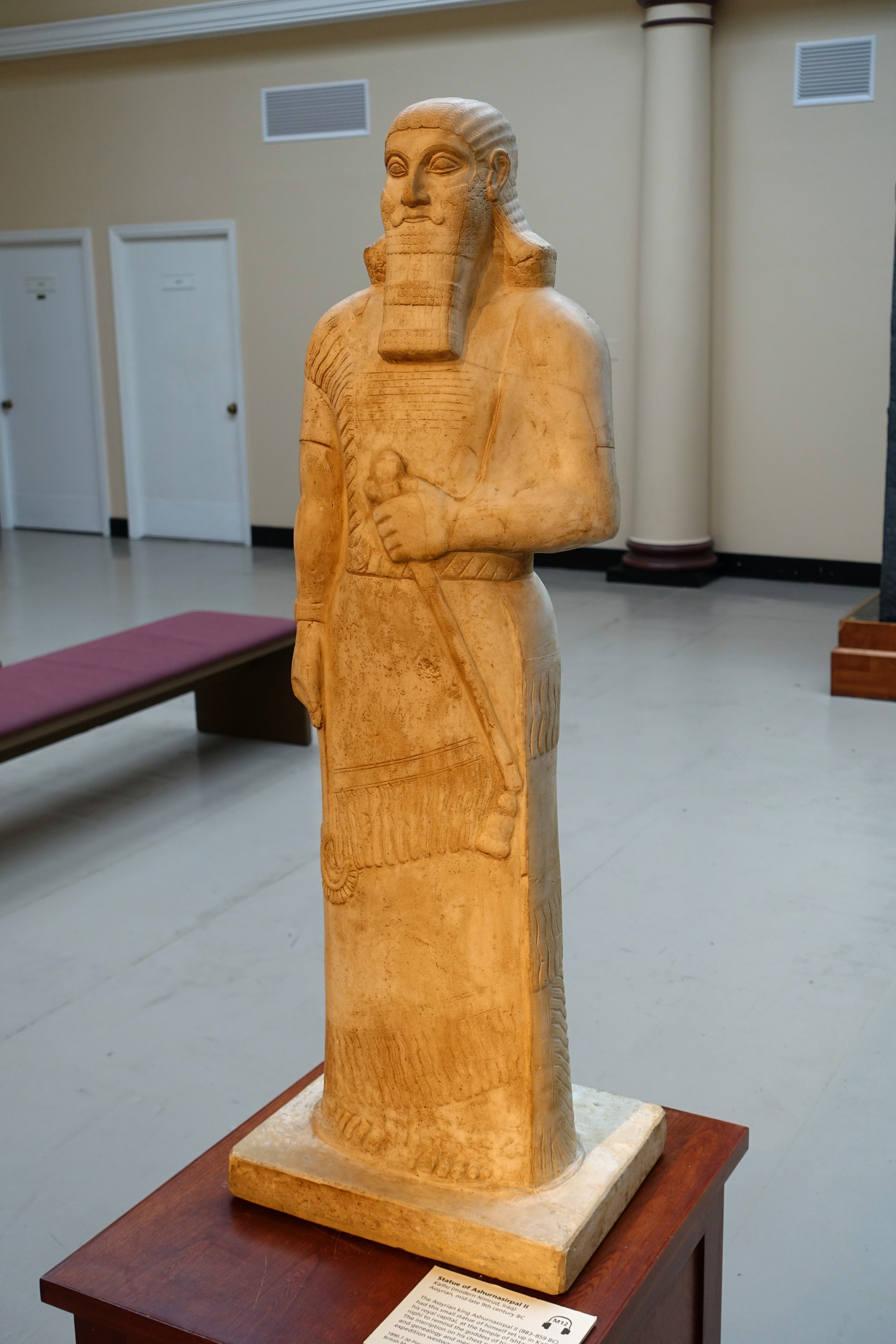
- Material: Magnesite
- Height: 113 cm
- Width: 32 cm
- Depth: 15 cm
- Created: 883-859 B.C.E.
- Period/culture: Neo-Assyrian period
- Present location: British Museum, London
- Identification: ME 118871
- Period: Iron Age
- Culture: Neo-Assyrian

The Statue of Ashurnasirpal II is a rare example of Assyrian sculpture in the round that was found in the mid nineteenth century at the ancient site of Kalhu (now known as Nimrud) by the famous archaeologist Austen Henry Layard. Dating from 883–859 BC, the statue has long been admired for its flawless condition and the high quality of its craftsmanship. It has been part of the British Museum's collection since 1851.

== Discovery ==
The statue was originally placed in the Temple of Ishtar to remind the deity of the king's piety. It is made of magnesite, and the original pedestal upon which it stood is made of a reddish stone. Both of these materials are not found locally, so they were probably transported back to Nimrud after a military campaign abroad. Layard found the statue and pedestal in its original location in 1850. Within a year of its discovery, the sculpture had been dispatched to London.

== Description ==
The statue shows Ashurnasirpal without his Assyrian crown allowing the viewer to see the king's hair and beard which he wore fashionably long. Commentators note the statue's beard is more impressive than that which an average Assyrian would have found practical. The king's torso is covered by a short-sleeved tunic and a shawl. In his right hand he appears to hold a kind of sickle; in Assyrian religion gods were sometimes depicted using the sickle as weapon to fight monsters. In the king's left hand he clasps a mace, which symbolized the authority vested in him as vice-regent of the supreme god Ashur.

== Inscription ==
Across the king's chest there is an eight-line cuneiform inscription which proclaims his titles and genealogy, and mentions a military campaign he led from the river Tigris to Mount Lebanon and the 'Great Sea', which is assumed to be the Mediterranean Sea.
