= Eugenio Latilla =

British painter

Eugenio Honorius Nicolas Latilla RBA (1808, London – 30 October 1861, Chappaqua, New York) was an Anglo-Italian painter, architect, lecturer and author.

Eugenio Latilla was born in London, the son of a Neapolitan artist father and an English mother. The sculptor Horatia Augusta Latilla was his sister. He exhibited five paintings (La Biondina in 1829; Richard Godson in 1832; Richard Godson and Mrs. Paget in 1833; H.R.H. The Princess Victoria in 1837) at the Royal Academy. From 1838 to 1851 he frequently exhibited at the Society of British Artists, of which he was a member. Latilla married Harriott Goodwin at St. Marylebone Church on 8 November 1831. In 1842 he went to Rome and painted there several works (including a pifferaro; Preparing for a Carnival; Abraham dismissing Hagar and Ishmael). In 1847–1848 Latilla was in Florence; there he painted several works (including Jane Shore's Penance) and exhibited them on his return to London. In 1851 he emigrated to America with his family, consisting of his wife, one son and three daughters. He spent the rest of his life working in New York City and on projects in New York, New Jersey and Connecticut. Latilla was the architect for a Gothic cottage in Perth Amboy for Caroline Kirkland, a barn in Westchester County for Horace Greeley, and home decorations for Cyrus W. Field.
