= Bithyni =

Ancient Thracian tribe living in Anatolia

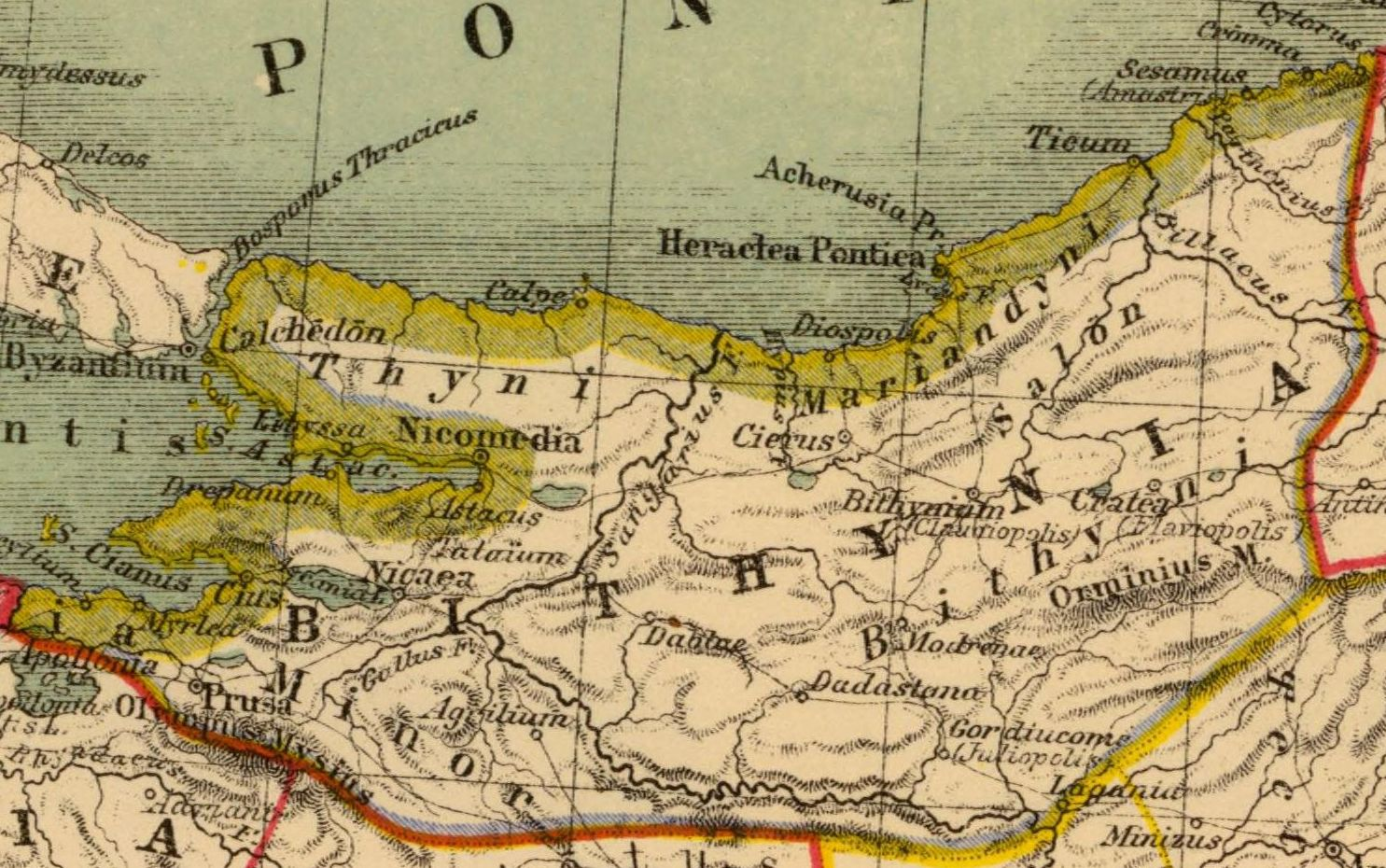
Bithynia, the region inhabited by the Bithyni

Strymon river, where the Bithyni are said to have originally lived under the name Strymoni

The Bithyni (/ˈbɪθɪnaɪ/; Ancient Greek: Βιθυνοί, romanized: Bithunoí; Latin: Bithyni) were a Thracian tribe who lived in northwestern Anatolia, in the region which was named Bithynia after them by the Ancient Greeks.

== History ==
The Bithyni originally lived in the area of the lower Strymon river, due to which the ancient Greeks claimed that they were originally called the Strymoni (Ancient Greek: Στρυμόνιοι, romanized: Strumónioi; Latin: Strymonii).

Around c. 700 BC, the Paeonians displaced the Bithynians in the Strymon valley, after which they Bithyni migrated eastwards, and crossed the Thracian Bosporus and settled in northwestern Anatolia, where they assimilated the Phrygians and the Bebryces, with the region becoming known as Bithynia after them.

The Dolonci tribe, who lived in the Thracian Chersonese and whom Greek mythology claimed were related to the Bithyni, might have been remnants of the Bithyni who were left behind on the European side of the Thracian Bosporus.

By the mid-6th century BC, the Bithyni had come under the rule of the Lydian Empire, after which they became part of the Persian Achaemenid Empire when Cyrus II annexed Lydia.

== Culture ==
The Bithyni used the round peltē shield in warfare.

== Sources ==
- Danov, Christo [in German] (1976). Altthrakien [Ancient Thrace] (in German). Berlin, Germany: De Gruyter.
- Mellink, M. (1991). "The Native Kingdoms of Anatolia". In Boardman, John; Edwards, I. E. S.; Hammond, N. G. L.; Sollberger, E.; Walker, C. B. F. (eds.). The Assyrian and Babylonian Empires and other States of the Near East, from the Eighth to the Sixth Centuries B.C. The Cambridge Ancient History. Vol. 3.2. Cambridge: Cambridge University Press. pp. 619–665. ISBN 978-1-139-05429-4.
- Mihailov, G. [in Bulgarian] (1991). "Thrace Before the Persian Entry into Europe". In Boardman, John; Edwards, I. E. S.; Hammond, N. G. L.; Sollberger, E.; Walker, C. B. F. (eds.). The Assyrian and Babylonian Empires and other States of the Near East, from the Eighth to the Sixth Centuries B.C. The Cambridge Ancient History. Vol. 3.2. Cambridge, United Kingdom: Cambridge University Press. pp. 591–618. ISBN 978-1-139-05429-4.
