= List of keepers of the British Museum =

The keepers are heads of the various departments of the British Museum. They are professional curators and related academics. There are currently nine departments plus the Portable Antiquities Scheme that have keepers.

== Keepers of Africa, Oceania and the Americas ==
The Keeper of Africa, Oceania and the Americas is head of the Department of Africa, Oceania and the Americas (Department of Ethnography until 2004).

- 1953–1969: Adrian Digby
- 1969–1974: William Buller Fagg
- 1974–1990: Malcolm McLeod
- 1991–2004: John Mack
- 2005-2012: J. C. H. King
- 2012–present: Lissant Bolton

== Keepers of Egypt and Sudan ==
The Keeper of Egypt and Sudan is head of the Department of Egypt and Sudan (formerly Department of Egyptian and Assyrian Antiquities, Department of Egyptian Antiquities, and Department of Ancient Egypt and Sudan).

- 1893–1924: E. A. Wallis Budge
- 1924–1930: Henry Hall
- 1931–1948: Sidney Smith
- 1948–1955: C. J. Gadd
- 1955–1974: I. E. S. Edwards
- 1974–1988: T. G. H. James
- 1988–2011: Vivian Davies
- 2012–2021: Neal Spencer
- 2021–present: Daniel Antoine

== Keepers of Asia ==
The Keeper of Asia is head of the Department of Asia (until 2003, the Department of Oriental Antiquities).

- 1946–1969: Basil Gray
- 1969–1977 Douglas Barrett
- 1977–1987 Lawrence Smith
- 1987–1994: Jessica Rawson
- 1994–2006: Robert Knox
- 2006–2014: Jan Stuart
- 2014–present: Jane Portal

=== Keepers of Japanese Antiquities ===
The Keeper of Japanese Antiquities was head of the Department of Japanese Antiquities. That department merged with the Department of Oriental Antiquities to form the Department of Asia.

- 1987–1997: Lawrence R. H. Smith
- 1997–2003: Victor Harris

== Keepers of Britain, Europe and Prehistory ==
The Keeper of Britain, Europe and Prehistory is the head of the Department of Britain, Europe and Prehistory (previously known as the Department of Europe and Prehistory)

- 2003–2007: Leslie Webster
- 2012–2015: Roger Bland
- 2015–present: Jill Cook

=== Keepers of British and Medieval Antiquities ===
The Keeper of British and Medieval Antiquities was the head of the Department of British and Medieval Antiquities (Department of British and Medieval Antiquities and Ethnography until 1921).

- 1866–1896: Augustus Wollaston Franks
- 1896–1921: Sir Charles Hercules Read
- 1921–1928: Ormonde Maddock Dalton

=== Keepers of Prehistoric and Romano-British Antiquities ===
The Keeper of Prehistoric and Romano-British Antiquities was head of the Department of Prehistoric and Romano-British Antiquities. The department was created from the Department of British and Medieval Antiquities in 1969.

- 1973–1995: Ian Heaps Longworth
- 1995–2000: Timothy W. Potter

=== Keepers of Medieval and Later Antiquities ===
The Keeper of Medieval and Later Antiquities was head of the Department of Medieval and Later Antiquities. The department was created from the Department of British and Medieval Antiquities in 1969.

- 1975–1998: Neil Stratford

== Keepers of Coins and Medals ==
The Keeper of Coins and Medals is head of the Department of Coins and Medals.

- 1861–1870: William Sandys Wright Vaux
- 1870–1893: Reginald Stuart Poole
- 1893–1906: Barclay V. Head
- 1906–1912: Herbert Appold Grueber
- 1912–1931: George Francis Hill
- 1931–1949: John Allan
- 1949–1952: Stanley Robinson
- 1952–1964: John Walker
- 1965–1978: G. Kenneth Jenkins
- 1978–1983: Robert Carson
- 1983–1990: John Kent
- 1990–1992: Mark Jones
- 1992–2003: Andrew Burnett
- 2003–2010: Joe Cribb
- 2010–2020: Philip Attwood
- 2020–2022: Jane Portal; Acting Keeper
- 2022-present: Tom Hockenhull

== Keepers of Conservation ==
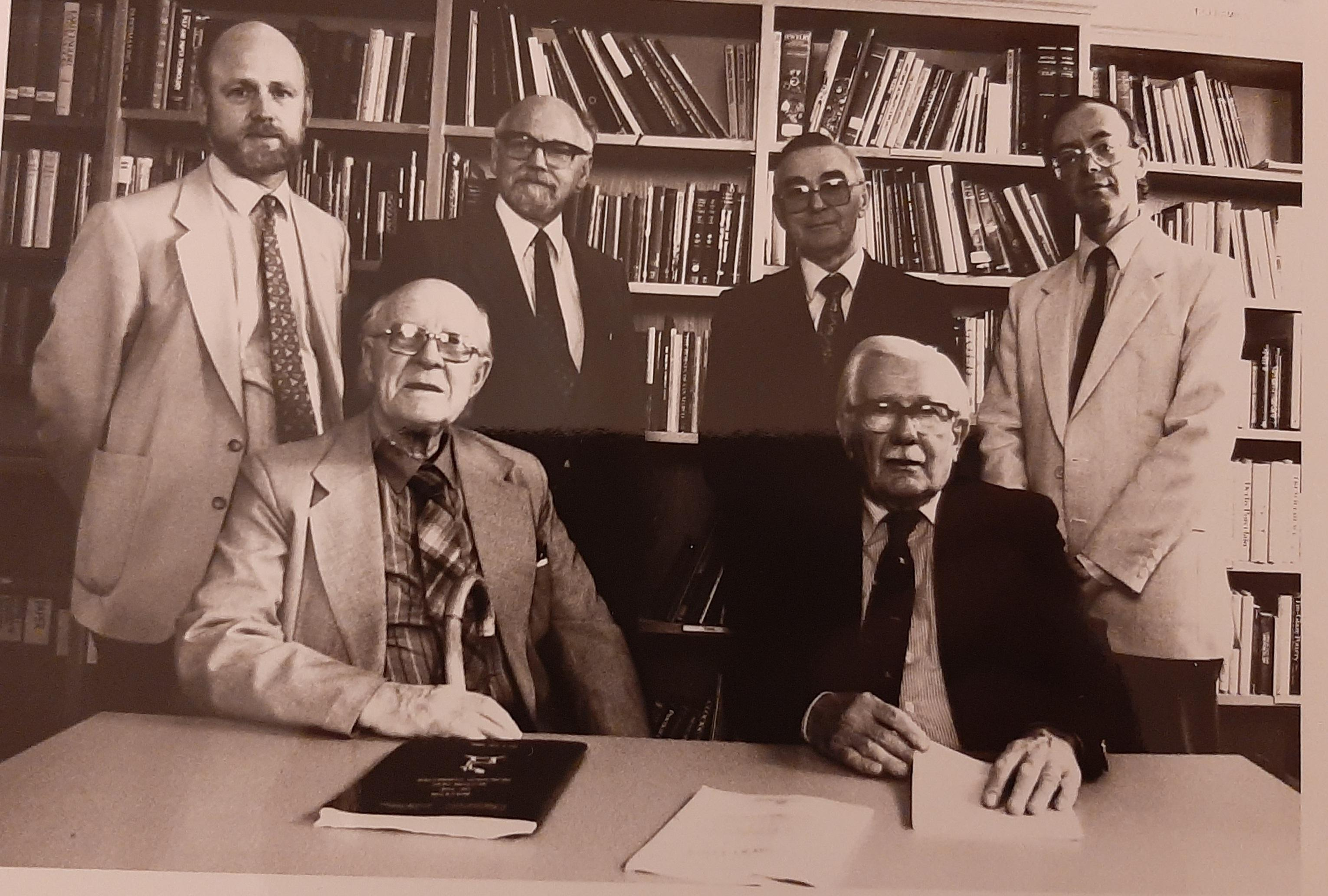
Keepers at the British Museum - Conservation Technical Service and Research. Back Row L-R: Andrew Oddy, Dr Michael W. Pascoe, Harold Barker, Dr M Stile. Front Row L-R: Dr Harold Plenderleith, Dr Anthony Werner

The Keeper of Conservation and Scientific Research is head of the Department of Conservation and Scientific Research.

- 1975–1979: Harold Barker; Keeper of Conservation and Technical Services
- 1979 - 1981: Michael W. Pascoe, Keeper of Conservation
- 1985–2002: Andrew Oddy; Keeper of Conservation
- 2002–2005: Sheridan Bowman; Keeper of Conservation, Documentation and Science
- 2005–2015: David Saunders; Keeper of Conservation and Scientific Research
- 2015-present: Carl Heron

== Keepers of Greece and Rome ==
The Keeper of Greece and Rome is head of the Department of Greece and Rome. It was formerly known as the Keeper of Greek and Roman Antiquities.

- 1861–1885: Charles Thomas Newton
- 1886–1904: Alexander Stuart Murray
- 1904–1909: Cecil Harcourt Smith
- 1909–1925: Arthur Smith
- 1925–1932: Henry Beauchamp Walters
- 1932–1936: John Forsdyke
- 1936–1939: Frederick N. Pryce
- 1939–1956: Bernard Ashmole
- 1956–1976: D. E. L. Haynes
- 1976–1993: Brian Cook
- 1993–2007: Dyfri Williams
- 2007–2023: Lesley Fitton
- 2023-present: Thomas Harrison

== Keepers of the Middle East ==
The Keeper of the Middle East is head of the Department of the Middle East (formerly Department of Western Asiatic Antiquities, then Department of Ancient Near East).

- 1955–1974: Richard David Barnett
- 1974–1983: Edmond Sollberger
- 1985–1989: Terence Croft Mitchell
- 1989–2011: John Curtis
- 2012–2022: Jonathan N. Tubb
- Current: Paul Collins

== Keepers of Portable Antiquities and Treasure ==
Keeper of Portable Antiquities and Treasure is head of the Department of Portable Antiquities and Treasure, and head of the Portable Antiquities Scheme.

- 2005–2013: Roger Bland

== Keepers of Prints and Drawings ==
The Simon Sainsbury Keeper of Prints and Drawings is head of the Department of Prints and Drawings.

- 1833–1836: William Young Ottley
- 1836–1845: Henry Josi
- 1845–1866: William Hookham Carpenter
- 1866–1883: George William Reid
- 1883–1912: Sidney Colvin
- 1912–1932: Campbell Dodgson
- 1933–1945: Arthur Mayger Hind
- 1945–1954: Arthur E. Popham
- 1954–1973: Edward Croft-Murray
- 1973–1981: John Gere
- 1981–1991: John Rowlands
- 1991–2011: Antony Griffiths
- 2011–present: Hugo Chapman
