= Professor of Egyptology =

The title of Professor of Egyptology may refer to the holders of one of the following professorial chairs:

- Edwards Professor of Egyptian Archaeology and Philology, at University College London
- Professor of Egyptology (Oxford), at the University of Oxford
- Sir Herbert Thompson Professor of Egyptology, at the University of Cambridge
