= Margaret Stefana Drower =

British egyptologist

Peggy Drower MBE
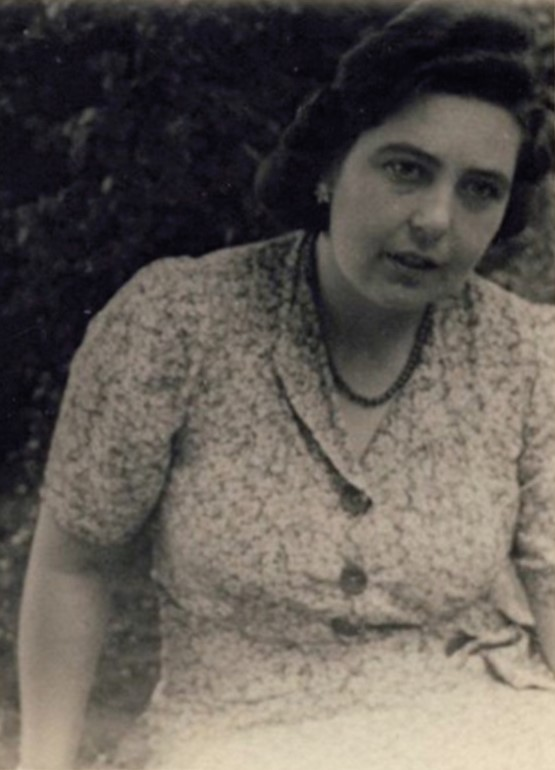
- Margeret "Peggy" Drower in Baghdad during the early 1940s
- Born: Margaret Stefana Drower; 8 December 1911; Southampton, Hampshire, England
- Died: 12 November 2012 (aged 100); London, England
- Occupation: Academic
- Spouse: Campbell Hackforth-Jones (m. 1947)
- Parent(s): Sir Edwin and Lady Edith Drower

Academic background
- Education: University College London

Academic work
- Discipline: Historian
- Sub-discipline: Ancient Near East
- Institutions: University College London
- Notable works: Flinders Petrie: A Life in Archaeology

Margaret Stefana Hackforth-Jones MBE (née Drower; 8 December 1911 – 12 November 2012), also known as Peggy Drower, was an English historian of Ancient Near Eastern History and Egyptology. She was awarded the MBE and elected a Fellow of the Society of Antiquaries of London. She wrote the definitive biography of Flinders Petrie.

== Early life ==
Drower was the daughter of Sir Edwin Drower, a British diplomat, and Lady Ethel Stefana Drower, an anthropologist, specialist on the Mandaeans and (under the name E. S. Stevens) a well-published author of romantic novels. She was a student of Flinders Petrie, Margaret Murray and Stephen Glanville, and become one of the first Egyptology graduates from University College London (UCL).

She was given the Mandaean baptismal name Marganita beth Klila (Classical Mandaic: ࡌࡀࡓࡂࡀࡍࡉࡕࡀ ࡐࡕ ࡊࡋࡉࡋࡀ, romanized: Marganita pt Klila, lit. 'Pearl, daughter of Wreath') when she lived among the Mandaeans in Iraq with her mother E. S. Drower before World War II. (Margaret and Marganita both share a common Persian etymology.)

In 1947, she married barrister Campbell Hackforth-Jones, younger brother of Gilbert Hackforth-Jones. They met in Baghdad during World War II.

== Career ==
Drower's excavations included Armant with O. H. Myers, Robert Mond and Ali Suefi, and at Amarna with John Pendlebury. Stephen Glanville recommended her for a post in the History department at UCL.

During the Second World War she worked with Freya Stark at the Baghdad Ministry of Information, using her skill as an Arabic speaker. After the war she returned to UCL to become a Reader in Ancient History and developed the Ancient History/Egyptology degree. After her retirement she became a Fellow of UCL and a visiting professor at the Institute of Archaeology.

She contributed to many books, especially the Cambridge Ancient History series, and documentary programmes on the ancient Middle East. Her key work was on the life and correspondence of Flinders Petrie.

== Bibliography ==
- Petrie, W M Flinders; Hilda Petrie, Lady; Drower, Margaret S (2004), Letters from the desert : the correspondence of Flinders and Hilda Petrie, Aris and Phillips, ISBN 9780856687488
- Drower, Margaret S (1985), Flinders Petrie : A life in archaeology, Gollancz, ISBN 9780575036673
- Edwards, I E S (1975), Edwards, I. E. S; Gadd, C. J; Hammond, N. G. L; Sollberger, E (eds.), The Cambridge ancient history. / Vol. 2. Part 2, History of the Middle East and the Aegean region, c. 1380-1000 B.C (PDF), Cambridge University Press, doi:10.1017/CHOL9780521086912, ISBN 0511466773
- Edwards, I E S (1973), Edwards, I. E. S; Gadd, C. J; Hammond, N. G. L; Sollberger, E (eds.), The Cambridge ancient history. / Vol. 2. Part 1, History of the Middle East and the Aegean region, c. 1800-1380 B.C (PDF), Cambridge University Press, doi:10.1017/CHOL9780521082303, ISBN 0511466765
- Patrick, Richard; Drower, Margaret S (1972), All colour book of Egyptian mythology, Cathay Books, ISBN 9780861780396
- Drower, Margaret S; Sorrell, Alan (1970), Nubia: a drowning land, New York, Atheneum, OCLC 445809
- Drower, Margaret S (1970), Syria c. 1550-1400 B.C, Cambridge ancient history. Rev. ed., fasc. 64, Cambridge, Cambridge University Press, ISBN 9780521074117
- Drower, Margaret S; Bottéro, Jean (1968), Syria before 2200 B.C, Cambridge ancient history. Rev. ed., fasc. 55, London, Cambridge University Press, OCLC 41788
- Drower, Margaret S (1968), Ugarit, Cambridge ancient history. Rev. ed., fasc. 63, University Press, ISBN 9780521073219
- Drower, Margaret S; Wood, Roger (1965), Umetnost Egipta (in Serbian), Jugoslavija, ISBN 9780299146238, OCLC 440612497
- Wood, Roger; Drower, Margaret S (1964), Egypt in color, New York, McGraw-Hill, OCLC 475265
- Drower, Margaret S (1942), The political approach to the classical world, Glanville, Stephen Ranulph Kingdon, ed. The legacy of Egypt.: Clarendon, OCLC 80184598
- Glanville, S R K (1942), The legacy of Egypt, Oxford, Clarendon Press, OCLC 910976
- Mond, Robert; Myers, Oliver Humphrys; Drower, Margaret Stefana (1940), Temples of Armant : A preliminary survey, Memoir, 43, The Egypt Exploration Society, ISBN 9780299146238, OCLC 601564227
- Drower, Margaret S (June 1995), The domestication of the horse, The domestication and exploitation of plants and animals, S. 471-478, ISBN 9780299146238, OCLC 605737110
- Margaret S. Drower (2004). "Petrie, Sir (William Matthew) Flinders". Oxford Dictionary of National Biography (online ed.). Matthew, H. C. G., editor; Oxford Dictionary of National Biography: Oxford University Press. doi:10.1093/ref:odnb/35496. (Subscription, Wikipedia Library access or UK public library membership required.)
