= Roly Drower =

English software engineer, journalist, satirist, activist, poet, broadcaster and composer

- Roly Drower pictured on the cover of his posthumous book Bramblespit (Manx Heritage Foundation, 2009)
- Born: October 12, 1953; London, England
- Died: 12 May 2008 (aged 54); Isle of Man
- Education: University College London
- Occupations: Writer, musician and activist

Roland Paul Drower, FRAS (12 October 1953 – 12 May 2008), known as Roly, was an English software engineer, journalist, satirist, activist, poet, broadcaster and composer. He is best remembered for his contributions to the political and artistic life of his adopted home, the Isle of Man, and for his protracted legal conflict with Albert Gubay, the multi-millionaire founder of the Kwik Save supermarket chain.

== Background ==
Drower came from an accomplished family. His great-grandparents, Joseph and Elizabeth Cunningham, set up Britain's first holiday camp. His grandfather, Sir Edwin Mortimer Drower, was a British diplomat who served as a judicial adviser to the government of Iraq. His grandmother, Lady Ethel Stefana Drower, was an oriental anthropologist who wrote romantic novels for Mills and Boon under her maiden name of E. S. Stevens. His uncle, Captain William Mortimer Drower, worked as a translator in Japanese prison camps during the Second World War, and later served in the British Embassy in Washington. His aunt, Professor Margaret Drower, was an Egyptologist at University College London and the biographer of Flinders Petrie. His father, Denys Drower, was a BBC announcer who was heard as 'London Calling' during the Second World War and also appeared on the Goon Show; in retirement he became a writer of fiction, local history and atheist doggerel. Drower's mother, Angela Drower, was a watercolour painter. His sister, Jill Drower, formerly a dancer in a countercultural 1960s commune, is a social historian.

== Early life ==
Born on 12 October 1953, Drower grew up in an affluent middle-class household in Putney, a suburb of southwest London. He attended a small local preparatory school until the age of thirteen, when he was sent to board at Stowe, an independent school based in Stowe House, a grand neoclassical mansion that had once been the country home of the Dukes of Buckingham and Chandos. His time in Stowe's Grafton House, enlivened by a sword fight and an extracurricular experiment with nitroglycerine, was cut short when he was expelled in 1972.

After working in railway track maintenance and then a biscuit factory while studying science and mathematics in evening classes, Drower enrolled in the Department of Physics and Astronomy at University College London in 1976. Together with his friend David C. Jewitt, later a Kavli and Shaw laureate and the joint discoverer of the Kuiper Belt, he graduated with a first class honours degree in astronomy in 1979. He remained at UCL to undertake a Ph.D. in solar physics at the College's Mullard Space Science Laboratory under the supervision of Dr John Parkinson, but he abandoned his researches before completing his thesis.

== Career ==
A retired diplomat, a friend of Drower's uncle William, hired Drower to help plan a science museum for Saudi Arabia, but the project never came to fruition. Prompted in part by a random assault on his own doorstep that almost killed him, Drower decided to relocate from his council flat in a Brentford tower block to a cottage in Kirk Andreas on the Isle of Man, near where his parents were living in retirement.

Drower had learned how to code in Fortran as an undergraduate, and had deepened his knowledge of computing by teaching himself how to use an early Apple PC. On the Isle of Man he got a job as a computer technician working for Manx Independent Carriers. He also wrote the original operating software for the Isle of Man Hyperbaric Chamber (a decompression facility for deep sea divers).

== Literature and music ==
In London, Drower had written comic autobiographical sketches for a motorcycling magazine and an unpublished fantasy novel. On the Isle of Man, his involvement in the arts deepened. He wrote humorous memoirs, short stories and poems exploring the gamut of his many interests, including theology, mythology, philosophy, mathematics, physics, astronomy, ecology and current Manx affairs. He broadcast his poems on Manx radio and travelled around the island performing them in pubs and village halls, and he edited the magazine of the Isle of Man Poetry Society.

As a musician, he composed electronic scores that sometimes incorporated elements drawn from Manx folk traditions. He issued his work both on CD and online under the pseudonym of the Sulby Phantom Band.

Drower also helped to organize the annual Sulby Fringe. Towards the end of his life, he moved from his home in Sulby to rent Ballacreggan Farm, which he transformed into a refuge for Bohemian artists – a countercultural Rivendell reminiscent of the Exploding Galaxy commune in London's 99 Balls Pond Road to which his sister Jill had belonged in the 1960s.

== Activism ==
Drower used his computer skills to create Manx Megalinks, a web portal intended as a resource for a variety of Manx special interest groups. He also set up a website of his own, Manxman.com, on which he posted satirical comments about Manx politics. He instituted Manxman's Black Pages as a place where people unhappy about Manx issues could ventilate their concerns. The website's postings about a property development planned by Albert Gubay, the multi-millionaire founder of the Kwik Save supermarket chain, provoked Gubay into suing Drower for libel. Gubay obtained an order unprecedented in Manx legal history which required the searching of Drower's home and the seizure of his computers, and also banned him from discussing the case with anyone – even his wife – apart from his lawyers. Despite Gubay's efforts to have him imprisoned, Drower refused to name the source who, he said, had supplied him with the information upon which his allegations against Gubay were based. Because the Isle of Man had no statute that allowed journalists a privileged right to keep the identity of their informants secret, Judge Michael Kerruish found Drower guilty of contempt of court, fined him £2,500 and ordered him to contribute towards Gubay's legal costs.

In 2005, the Manx section of the Celtic League and Mec Vannin, a political party that seeks Manx independence from the United Kingdom, invited Drower to deliver a speech at their annual commemoration of the seventeenth century Manx politician Illiam Dhone. Drower said that in his opinion, Manx governance was characterized by "spin, arrogance, secrecy, a system of block vote, cronyism and consensus by reward".

== Personal life ==
Drower's voluntary work included serving beside his mother as a Red Cross First Aider to support the Isle of Man's annual TT race. In politics, his affiliation was dark green. He deplored the Isle of Man's suburbanization, and believed that economic growth should be halted. Despite his middle-class upbringing, he had little regard for money, finding wealth in community and creativity rather than in pounds and pence. In religion, he investigated Christianity, Islam and Hinduism before settling on a mordantly mocking atheism. In person, he was a slight, energetic figure with the scruffy mien of a perpetual undergraduate, a gentle man with a keen eye for absurdity. He was a lover of billiards, swimming, boating, climbing trees, the Manx countryside, twentieth century Russian classical music, curry, cigarettes and whisky.

Among Drower's friends were the poets Roy McMillan, Vinty Kneale and Jane Holland and the great horologist George Daniels, whom he met through their shared enthusiasm for motorcycling. His wife, Janet, he married while still studying at UCL. Some years after their move to the Isle of Man they agreed to an amicable separation, and Drower established a partnership with Anne Cain. He acted as a stepfather to Cain's children, but never had any children of his own.

== Death and legacy ==
Drower died suddenly on 12 May 2008, aged 54, of a myocardial infarction. Several commemorations celebrated his contributions to Manx life. In 2009, his father compiled Bramblespit, an anthology of some of Drower's writings that included stories, poems, his Illiam Dhone oration and a picaresque memoir of his time at Stowe.

== Honours ==
In 2009, Drower was posthumously named the inaugural winner of the Libertarian Vannin award, in recognition of his efforts to defend human rights and to uphold the values of the Liberal Vannin Party. The award was received by Drower's father at the Party's annual conference.
