= Harry Smith (Egyptologist) =

British Egyptologist and academic (1928–2024)

Harry Smith FBA
- Born: Henry Sidney Smith; 14 June 1928
- Died: 8 September 2024 (aged 96)
- Citizenship: United Kingdom

Academic background
- Education: Merchant Taylors' School, Northwood
- Alma mater: Christ's College, Cambridge

Academic work
- Discipline: Egyptology
- Sub-discipline: Archaeology of Ancient Egypt; archaeology of Nubia; epigraphy
- Institutions: University of Cambridge; Christ's College, Cambridge; Egypt Exploration Society; University College, London

Henry Sidney Smith, FBA (14 June 1928 – 8 September 2024) was a British Egyptologist and academic, specialising in epigraphy and Egyptian archaeology. He held the Edwards Chair of Egyptology at University College London from 1970 to 1986. He had previously been a lecturer in Egyptology at the University of Cambridge, where he was also Budge Fellow in Egyptology at Christ's College, Cambridge.

== Early life and education ==
Smith was born on 14 June 1928 to Sidney Smith, FBA, an Assyriologist and curator, and his wife Mary (nee Parker), an artist. He was educated at Merchant Taylors' School, Northwood, an all-boys private school. Between school and university, he undertook his national service. Having won an Open Scholarship, he matriculated into Christ's College, Cambridge, in September 1949 to study classics. He switched to Oriental Studies, specialising in Egyptology, Coptic and Arabic. He was awarded the five-year Lady Wallis Budge Scholarship in 1950. He graduated from the University of Cambridge with a starred first class Bachelor of Arts (BA) degree in 1953: as per tradition, his BA was later promoted to a Master of Arts (MA Cantab) degree. He then studied Demotic, a late Ancient Egyptian script, under Stephen Glanville. He was awarded a Doctor of Letters (DLit) degree by the University of London in 1987.

== Academic career ==
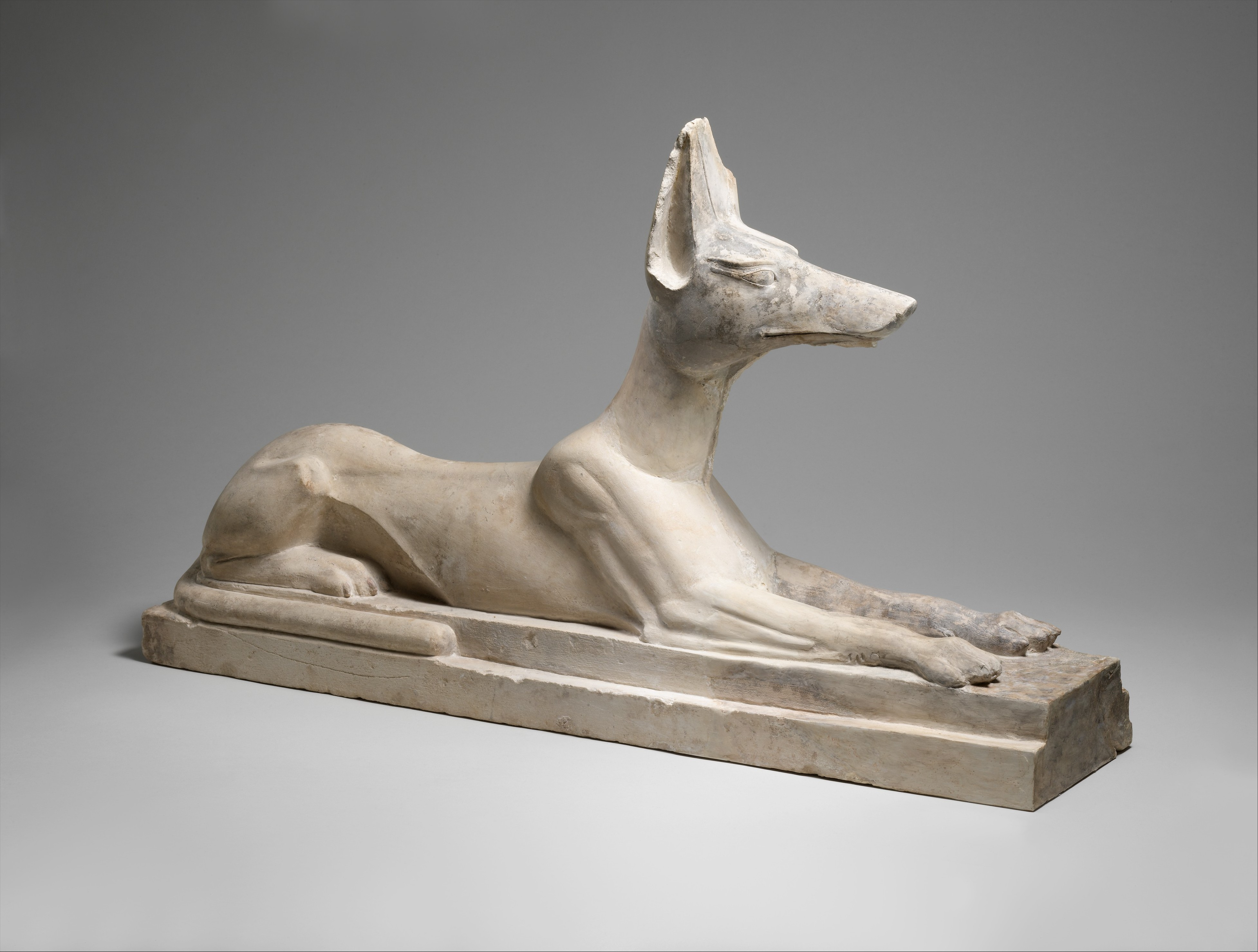
Recumbent Anubis statue from Saqqara's Sacred Animal Necropolis, excavated 1966–67

From 1953 to 1954, Smith worked as an epigraphist on the Theban tombs, and was an assistant to W. B. Emery at his archaeological excavation at Saqqara. He was appointed a lecturer in Egyptology at the University of Cambridge in 1954, and was elected Budge Research Fellow in Egyptology at Christ's College, Cambridge the following year. He continued to assist at excavations in Egypt and Nubia, working at the Buhen fortress and Qasr Ibrim from 1959. From 1959 to 1960, he was on leave from his university positions to undertake fieldwork: he gained his first archaeological excavation experience at Beycesultan, Turkey, under Seton Lloyd, before excavating at Buhen in Sudanese Nubia under W. B. Emery and at Nimrud in Iraq under David Oates.

In 1960, Smith returned to Christ's College, Cambridge as a fellow. In 1961, he directed the Egypt Exploration Society's archaeological survey of Egyptian Nubia in preparation for the Aswan Dam. He was additionally a temporary tutor at his college from 1961 to 1963.

In 1963, he moved to University College, London (UCL), where he had been appointed Reader in Egyptian Archaeology. He was additionally appointed an honorary curator of the Petrie Museum of Egyptian Archaeology, a position he held between 1963 and 1970. From 1964 to 1965, he once more directed the EES's Egyptian Nubian Survey. He was field director of the excavations at Saqqara's Sacred Animal Necropolis between 1964 and 1976. In 1970, he was appointed to the Edwards Chair of Egyptology and head of UCL's Department of Egyptology. He directed excavations at Saqqara and Memphis between 1970 and 1988. He stepped down from the chair in 1986 and as head of department in 1988. He was made Professor Emeritus of Egyptology by UCL in 1993, upon his retirement.

== Personal life and death ==
In 1961, Smith married Hazel Flory Leeper. His wife predeceased him, dying in 1991.

Smith died on 8 September 2024, at the age of 96.

== Honours ==
In 1985, Smith was elected a Fellow of the British Academy (FBA), the United Kingdom's national academy for the humanities and social sciences.

== Selected works ==
- Smith, Harry S. (1962). Preliminary Reports of the Egypt Exploration Society's Nubian Survey. Cairo: Government Print.
- Smith, Harry Sidney (1974). A visit to ancient Egypt: life at Memphis & Saqqara, c. 500-30 B.C. Aris & Phillips. ISBN 978-0856680243.
- Smith, Harry Sidney (1976). The Fortress of Buhen: the inscriptions. London: Egypt Exploration Society.
- Emery, W. B.; Millard, A.; Smith, H. S. (1976). The Fortress of Buhen: the archaeological report. London: Egypt Exploration Society.
- Smith, H. S.; Davies, Sue (2005). The Sacred Animal Necropolis at North Saqqara. The falcon complex and catacomb: the archaeological report. London: Egypt Exploration Society. ISBN 978-0856981654.
- Smith, H. S.; Davies, Sue; Frazer, K. J. (2006). The Sacred Animal Necropolis at North Saqqara. The main temple complex: the archaeological report. London: Egypt Exploration Society. ISBN 978-0856981708.
- Smith, Harry (2022). Nubian Memoirs. Paolo Scremin. ISBN 9781999643812.
