= Jack Plumley =

British Anglican priest (1910–1999)

The Reverend Jack Plumley FSA
- Born: Jack Martin Plumley; 2 September 1910; Peverell, Devon, England
- Died: 2 July 1999 (aged 88)
- Title: Sir Herbert Thompson Professor of Egyptology, Cambridge University (1957 to 1977)

Academic background
- Education: Merchant Taylors' School
- Alma mater: St John's College, Durham; King's College, Cambridge

Academic work
- Discipline: Egyptology
- Sub-discipline: Coptic; Qasr Ibrim; Papyrology
- Institutions: University of Cambridge

Jack Martin Plumley, FSA (2 September 1910 – 2 July 1999) was a British Anglican priest, Egyptologist and academic. Having served as a priest in the Church of England, he was Sir Herbert Thompson Professor of Egyptology at the University of Cambridge from 1957 to 1977.

== Early life and education ==
Plumley was born on 2 September 1910 in Peverell, Devon, England. He was educated at Merchant Taylors' School, an all-boys public school in Ruislip, Middlesex. In 1929, he matriculated into St John's College, Durham, an Anglican theological college, to study theology. He graduated from the University of Durham with a Bachelor of Arts (BA) degree in 1932. He then spent a further year at the St John's while training for ordination. In 1950, he was awarded Master of Arts (MA Cantab) status by King's College, Cambridge.

== Career ==
=== Ordained ministry ===
Plumley was ordained in the Church of England as a deacon in 1933 during a service at St Paul's Cathedral in London. He was ordained as a priest in 1934. He served his curacy in the Diocese of London. He was Vicar of Christ Church, Hoxton from 1942 to 1945, and Vicar of St Paul's Church, Tottenham from 1945 to 1947.

In 1947, Plumley moved to the Diocese of Ely. He served as Rector of All Saints' Church, Milton between 1947 and 1957. He was a select preacher at the University of Cambridge in 1955 and in 1959. In 1957, he was appointed to a professorship at the University of Cambridge, and therefore left full-time ministry.

Plumley held permission to officiate in the Diocese of Ely from 1967 to 1980, and from 1980 to 1999. In 1980, he was Priest in Charge of St Mary's church, Longstowe; he remained as a minister of that parish until 1995. From 1981 to 1982, he was a chaplain of Pembroke College, Cambridge, and its acting dean.

=== Academic career ===
While in London, Plumley began taking classes in Egyptology with Stephen Glanville at University College London. After the War, Glanville was appointed Sir Herbert Thompson Professor of Egyptology in Cambridge; Plumley became his assistant, and, on Glanville's death in 1956, his successor. He was chairman of the Department of Egyptology from 1957 until 1977. Plumley wrote numerous books, articles, and essays, and oversaw excavations including those at Qasr Ibrim ahead of the flooding caused by the Aswan Dam. He discovered and published the scrolls of Bishop Timothy of Faras. He was elected a member of the Society of Antiquaries of London in 1966. From 1978 to 1982 he was president of the International Society for Nubian Studies.

== Personal life ==
In 1938, Plumley married Gwendolen Darling; she died in 1984. Together they had three sons. In 1986, Plumley married Ursula Dowle.

Plumley died in Cambridge on 2 July 1999.

== Selected works ==
- Plumley, J. Martin (1948). An Introduction Coptic Grammar. London: Home and van Thal.
- Plumley, J. Martin (1975). The Scrolls of Bishop Timotheos: Two Documents from Mediaeval Nubia. London: Egypt Exploration Society. ISBN 978-0856980442.
- Plumley, J. Martin, ed. (1982). Nubian Studies (Proceedings of the International Society for Nubian Studies). Oxford: Aris & Phillips Ltd. ISBN 978-0856681981.
- Browne, Gerald M.; Plumley, J. Martin, eds. (1988). Old Nubian Texts from Qasr Ibrim: Part 1. London: Egypt Exploration Society. ISBN 978-0856981005.
