= The Cambridge Ancient History =

Collective academic books on ancient history

- Country: United Kingdom
- Language: English
- Publisher: Cambridge University Press
- Published: 1924–1939; 1970–2005
- No. of books: 12 (first series); 19 (second series)

The Cambridge Ancient History is a multi-volume work of ancient history from prehistory to late antiquity, published by Cambridge University Press. The first series, consisting of 12 volumes, was planned in 1919 by Irish historian J. B. Bury and published between 1924 and 1939, co-edited by Frank Adcock and Stanley Arthur Cook. The second series was published between 1970 and 2005, consisting of 14 volumes in 19 books.

The Cambridge Ancient History is part of a larger series of works, along with The Cambridge Medieval History and The Cambridge Modern History, intended to cover the entire history of European civilisation. In the original edition, it was the last in this series to appear, the first volume of the Modern History having been published in 1902, and the first volume of the Medieval History in 1911. In the second series, however, the Ancient History began to be published before the Medieval History.

== First series ==
1. Egypt and Babylonia to 1580 B.C. (1923).
2. The Egyptian and Hittite Empires to c. 1000 B.C. (1924).
3. The Assyrian Empire. (1926).
4. The Persian Empire and the West. (1926).
5. Athens. 478–401 B.C. (1927).
6. Macedon. 401–301 B.C. (1927).
7. The Hellenistic Monarchies and the Rise of Rome. (1928).
8. Rome and the Mediterranean. 218–133 B.C. (1930).
9. The Roman Republic. 133–44 B.C. (1932).
10. The Augustan Empire. 44 B.C.–A.C. 70. (1934).
11. The Imperial Peace. A.D. 70–192. (1936).
12. The Imperial Crisis and Recovery. A.D. 193–324. (1939).

== Second series ==
=== Volumes published ===
- I part I (1970): Prolegomena and Prehistory – edited by I.E.S. Edwards, C.J. Gadd, N.G.L. Hammond

Chapter	Title	Author
1	The geological ages	David Leslie Linton & F. Moseley
2	Physical conditions in Eastern Europe, Western Asia and Egypt before the period of agricultural and urban settlement	K. W. Butzer
3	Primitive Man in Egypt, Western Asia and Europe in Palaeolithic times, & in Mesolithic times	Dorothy A. E. Garrod & Grahame Clark
4	The evidence of Language	William F. Albright & Thomas Oden Lambdin
5	The earliest populations of man in Europe, Western Asia and Northern Africa	D. R. Hughes & Donald Reginald Brothwell
6	Chronology: I. Egypt—to the end of the Twentieth Dynasty. II. Ancient Western Asia. III. The Aegean Bronze Age	William C. Hayes, Michael B. Rowton, Frank Henry Stubbings
7	(a) The earliest settlements in Western Asia from the ninth to the end of the fifth millennium B.C. (b) Anatolia before 4000 B.C.	James Mellaart
8	The development of cities from Al-'Ubaid to the end of Uruk 5	Max Edgar Lucien Mallowan
9	(a) Predynastic Egypt (b) Palestine during the Neolithic and Chalcolithic periods (c) Cyprus during the Neolithic and Chalcolithic periods	Elise Jenny Baumgartel, Roland de Vaux, Hector William Catling
10	The Stone Age in the Aegean	S. S. Weinberg

- I part II (1971): Early History of the Middle East – edited by I. E. S. Edwards, C. J. Gadd, N. G. L. Hammond

Chapter	Title	Author
11	The Early Dynastic Period in Egypt	I. E. S. Edwards
12	The last Predynastic Period in Babylonia	Henri Frankfort & Leri Davies
13	The cities of Babylonia	C. J. Gadd
14	The Old Kingdom in Egypt and the beginning of the First Intermediate Period	W. Stevenson Smith
15	Palestine in the early Bronze Age	Roland de Vaux
16	The Early Dynastic Period in Mesopotamia	Max Edgar Lucien Mallowan
17	Syria before 2200 B.C.	Margaret Stefana Drower & Jean Bottéro
18	Anatolia c. 4000–2300 B.C.	James Mellaart & Carl William Blegen
19	The dynasty of Agade and the Gutian invasion	C. J. Gadd
20	The Middle Kingdom in Egypt	William C. Hayes
21	Syria and Palestine c. 2160–1780 B.C.	Georges Posener, Jean Bottéro, Kathleen Mary Kenyon
22	Babylonia c. 2120–1800 B.C.	C. J. Gadd
23	Persia c.2400–1800 B.C.	Walther Hinz
24	Anatolia c.2300–1750 B.C.	James Mellaart, Carl William Blegen, Hildegard Lewy
25	Assyria c.2600–1816 B.C.	Hildegard Lewy
26	Greece, Crete, and the Aegean islands in the early Bronze Age	John Langdon Caskey & Hector William Catling
27	Immigrants from the north	R. A. Crossland

- II part I: History of the Middle East and the Aegean Region c.1800-1380 – edited by I. E. S. Edwards, C. J. Gadd, N. G. L. Hammond, L. Sollberger

Chapter	Title	Author
1	Northern Mesopotamia and Syria	J. R. Kupper
2	Egypt: from the death of Ammenemes III to Seqenenre II	William C. Hayes
3	Palestine in the Middle Bronze Age	Kathleen M. Kenyon
4	Greece and the Aegean Islands in the Middle Bronze Age	John Langdon Caskey
5	The maturity of Minoan civilization	Friedrich Matz
6	Cyprus in the Middle Bronze Age	H. W. Catling
7	Hammurabi and the end of his dynasty	C. J. Gadd
8	Anatolia c. 1750–1600 BC	Oliver R. Gurney
9	Persia c. 1800–1550 BC	O. Walther Hinz
10	Egypt: from the expulsion of the Hyksos to Amenophis I	T. G. H. James
11	Egypt: internal affairs from Tuthmosis I to the death of Amenophis III	William C. Hayes
12	Syria c. 1550–1400 BC	Margaret S. Drower
13	Palestine in the time of the Eighteenth Dynasty	Kathleen Mary Kenyon
14	The Zenith of Minoan civilization	F. Matz
15	The linear scripts	Sterling Dow and John Chadwick
16	The rise of Mycenaean civilization	Frank H. Stubbings
17	Anatolia C. 1660–1380 BC	Oliver R. Gurney
18	Troy VI	Carl William Blegen
19	The archaeological evidence of the second millennium BC on the Persian Plateau	Robert H. Dyson

- II part II: History of the Middle East and the Aegean Region c. 1380–1000
- III part I: The Prehistory of the Balkans; and the Middle East and the Aegean world, tenth to eighth centuries B.C.
- III part II: The Assyrian and Babylonian Empires and other States of the Near East, from the Eighth to the Sixth Centuries B.C.
- III part III: The Expansion of the Greek World, Eighth to Sixth Centuries B.C. – edited by John Boardman, N. G. L. Hammond
- IV: Persia, Greece and the Western Mediterranean C. 525 to 479 B.C.
- V: The Fifth Century B.C.
- VI: The Fourth Century B.C.
- VII part I: The Hellenistic World
- VII part II: The Rise of Rome to 220 B.C.

Chapter	Title	Author
1	The sources for early Roman history	R M Ogilvie and A Drummond
2	Archaic Rome between Latium and Etruria	M Torelli
3	The origins of Rome	A Momigliano
4	Rome in the fifth century I: the social and economic framework	A Drummond
5	Rome in the fifth century II: the citizen community	A Drummond
6	Rome and Latium to 390 BC	T J Cornell
7	The recovery of Rome	T J Cornell
8	The conquest of Italy	T J Cornell
9	Rome and Italy in the early third century	E S Staveley
10	Pyrrhus	P R Franke
11	Carthage and Rome	H H Scullard
12	Religion in republican Rome	J A North

- VIII: Rome and the Mediterranean to 133 B.C.

Chapter	Title	Author
1	Sources	A E Astin
2	The Carthaginians in Spain	H H Scullard
3	The Second Punic war	John Briscoe
4	Rome and Greece to 205 BC	R M Errington
5	Roman expansion in the west	W V Harris
6	Roman government and politics, 200–134 BC	A E Astin
7	Rome and Italy in the second century BC	E Gabba
8	Rome against Philip and Antiochus	R M Errington
9	Rome, the fall of Macedon, and the sack of Corinth	P S Derow
10	The Seleucids and their rivals	C Habicht
11	The Greeks of Bactria and India	A K Narain
12	Roman tradition and the Greek world	Elizabeth Rawson
13	The transformation of Italy, 300–133 BC. The evidence of archaeology	Jean-Paul Morel

- IX: The Last Age of the Roman Republic, 146-43 B.C.

Chapter	Title	Author	Pages
1	The crisis of the Republic: sources and source-problems	Andrew Lintott	1–15
2	The Roman empire and its problems in the second century	Andrew Lintott	16–39
3	Political history, 146–95 BC	Andrew Lintott	40–103
4	Rome and Italy: the Social war	E Gabba	104–28
5	Mithridates	John G F Hind	129–64
6	Sulla	Robin Seager	165–207
7	The rise of Pompey	Robin Seager	208–28
8a	Lucullus, Pompey, and the East	A N Sherwin-White	229–73
8b	The Jews under Hasmonean rule	Tessa Rajak	274–309
8c	Egypt, 146–31 BC	Dorothy J Thompson	310–26
9	The senate and the populares, 69–60 BC	T P Wiseman	327–67
10	Caesar, Pompey, and Rome, 59–50 BC	T P Wiseman	368–423
11	Caesar: civil war and dictatorship	Elizabeth Rawson	424–67
12	The aftermath of the Ides	Elizabeth Rawson	468–90
13	The constitution and public criminal law	Duncan Cloud	491–530
14	The development of Roman private law	J A Crook	531–63
15	The administration of the empire	John Richardson	564–98
16	Economy and society, 133–43 BC	C Nicolet	599–643
17	The city of Rome and the plebs urbana in the late republic	Nicholas Purcell	644–88
18	The intellectual developments of the Ciceronian age	Miriam Griffin	689–728
19	Religion	Mary Beard	729–768
	Epilogue	J A Crook	769–76

- X: The Augustan Empire, 43 B.C.-A.D. 69

Chapter	Title	Author
1	The triumviral period	Christopher Pelling
2	Political history, 30 BC to AD 14	J A Crook
3	Augustus: power, authority, achievement	J A Crook
4	The expansion of the empire under Augustus	Erich S Gruen
5	Tiberius to Nero	T E J Widemann
6	From Nero to Vespasian	T E J Widemann
7	The imperial court	Andrew Wallace-Hadrill
8	The imperial finances	D W Rathbone
9	The senate and senatorial and equestrian posts	Richard J A Talbert
10	Provincial administration and taxation	Alan K Bowman
11	The army and the navy	Lawrence Keppie
12	The administration of justice	H Galsterer
13a	Italy and Rome from Sulla to Augustus	M H Crawford
13b	Sicily, Sardinia, and Corsica	R J A Wilson
13c	Spain	G Alföldy
13d	Gaul	C Goudineau
13e	Britain 43 BC to AD 69	John Wacher
13f	Germany	C Rüger
13g	Raetia	J Wolff
13h	The Danubian and Balkan provinces	J J Wilkes
13i	Roman Africa: Ausutus to Vespasian	C R Whittaker
13j	Cyrene	Joyce Reynolds and J A Lloyd
14a	Greece (including Crete and Cyprus) and Asia minor from 43 BC to AD 69	B M Levick
14b	Egypt	Alan K Bowman
14c	Syria	David Kennedy
14d	Judaea	Martin Goodman
15	Rome and its development under Augustus and his successors	Nicholas Purcell
16	The place of religion: Rome in the early empire	S R F Price
17	The origins and spread of Christianity	G W Clarke
18	Social status and social legislation	Susan Treggiari
19	Literature and society	Gavin Townend
20	Roman art, 43 BC to AD 69	Mario Torelli
21	Early classical private law	Bruce W Frier

- XI: The High Empire, A.D. 70-192
- XII: The Crisis of Empire, A.D. 193–337
- XIII: The Late Empire, A.D. 337–425
- XIV: Late Antiquity: Empire and Successors, A.D. 425–600

== See also ==
- The Cambridge Medieval History
- The Cambridge Modern History
