= John W. Tait =

John W. Tait (born 1945) is a British Edwards Professor of Egyptology at the Institute of Archaeology, University College London, and was the head of the department till 2010. He received his PhD in Egyptian and Greek Papyrology from the University of Oxford. His research focuses on Ancient Egyptian literature, including documents written in hieroglyphs, hieratic, Demotic, and Greek. He has also worked as a member of the Project for the Publication of the Carlsberg Papyri and the Egypt Exploration Society.

== See also ==
- List of Egyptologists
