= Edmond Sollberger =

Scholar of the Sumerian language

Edmond Sollberger, FBA (12 October 1920 – 21 June 1989) was a Turkish-born, Swiss–British museum curator, cuneiformist and scholar of the Sumerian language.

== Early life and education ==
A Swiss citizen, Sollberger was born in Istanbul on 12 October 1920. He learnt to speak French, English, Turkish and Greek. He studied at the University of Geneva, graduating in 1945 and then continuing to study linguistics under Henri Frei. He then went to Rome, where studied Sumerian under Anton Deimel in 1947.

== Career ==
In 1949, Sollberger was appointed an assistant keeper of archaeology at the Musée d'Art et d'Histoire in Geneva. While there, he wrote Études de Linguistique Sumérienne (1950), Le Système Verbal dans les Inscriptions "Royales" Présargoniques de Lagaš (1952) and Corpus des Inscriptions "Royales" Présargoniques de Lagaš (1956); for the 1952 book, he received the DLitt from the University of Geneva in 1952.

In 1961, Sollberger moved to England to be a temporary assistant keeper of Western Asiatic antiquities at the British Museum under Richard David Barnett. With the brief exception of R. F. G. Sweet, he was the department's first cuneiformist since Cyril Gadd departed in 1955 (another cuneiformist, Hugo Figulla, was a supernumerary member of staff). In 1967, Sollberger was appointed to the full grade of assistant keeper. In 1970, he became deputy keeper in the department and in 1974 he succeeded Barnett as keeper. In 1963 and 1964, he edited two volumes for the series Cuneiform Texts from Babylonian Tablets in the British Museum (working from copies by Theophilus Goldridge Pinches); he made his own copies for another volume in the series (Pre-Sargonic and Sargonic Economic Texts) in 1972. He also wrote a popular book, The Babylonian Legend of the Flood (1962), as well as Inscriptions Royales Sumeriennes et Akkadiennes (with Robert Kupper, 1971); he edited The Pinches Manuscript (1978) and authored Administrative Texts Chiefly Concerning Textiles (1981). In the meantime, Sollberger had been appointed co-editor of The Cambridge Ancient History (1969) and from 1979 was the editor-in-chief of The Royal Inscriptions of Mesopotamia series based at the University of Toronto. He had been elected a Fellow of the British Academy (FBA) in 1973.

Sollberger had a stroke in 1982, which left him unable to continue his duties; he retired from the British Museum in 1983. He died on 21 June 1989; his wife Ariane and their two daughters survived him. A volume of studies in his memory has been edited by Paul Garelli.

Cultural offices
Preceded by Richard David Barnett	Keeper of Western Asiatic Antiquities, British Museum; 1974 to 1983	Succeeded by Terence Croft Mitchell
