= The Moving Finger =

1942/43 Miss Marple novel by Agatha Christie

- First edition (US)
- Author: Agatha Christie
- Language: English
- Series: Miss Marple novels
- Genre: Crime novel
- Publisher: Dodd, Mead and Company (US) Collins Crime Club (UK)
- Publication date: July 1942, (Dodd, Mead and Company), (US), June 1943, (Collins Crime Club), (UK)
- Publication place: United Kingdom
- Media type: Print (hardback & paperback)
- Pages: 229 (first edition, hardcover)
- ISBN: 978-0-00-712084-0
- Preceded by: The Body in the Library
- Followed by: A Murder Is Announced

The Moving Finger is a mystery novel by Agatha Christie, first published in the USA by Dodd, Mead and Company in July 1942 and in the UK by the Collins Crime Club in June 1943. The US edition retailed at $2.00 and the UK edition at seven shillings and sixpence.

The Burton siblings arrive in the village of Lymstock in Devon, and soon receive a poison pen letter accusing them of being lovers, not brother and sister. They are not the only ones in the village to receive such letters. A prominent resident is found dead with one such letter found next to her. The novel features the elderly detective Miss Marple in a relatively minor role, "a little old lady sleuth who doesn't seem to do much". She enters the story in the final quarter of the book, in a handful of scenes, after the police have failed to solve the crime.

The novel was well received on publication: "Agatha Christie is at it again, lifting the lid off delphiniums and weaving the scarlet warp all over the pastel pouffe." One reviewer noted that Miss Marple "sets the stage for the final exposure of the murderer." Another said this was "One of the few times Christie gives short measure, and none the worse for that."

== Title ==
The book takes its name from quatrain 51 of Edward FitzGerald's translation of the Rubáiyát of Omar Khayyám:

The Moving Finger writes; and, having writ,
Moves on: not all thy Piety nor Wit
Shall lure it back to cancel half a Line,
Nor all thy Tears wash out a Word of it.

The title shows in the story figuratively and literally. The anonymous letters point blame from one town resident to another. The police detective determines that the envelopes were all "typed by someone using one finger" to avoid a recognisable 'touch'.

== Plot ==
Siblings Jerry and Joanna Burton, from London, take up residence in a house owned by Miss Emily Barton near the quiet town of Lymstock for the last phase of Jerry's recovery from injuries he suffered as a pilot in a crash landing. Shortly after moving in, they receive an anonymous letter which makes the false accusation that the pair are lovers, not siblings. The Burtons learn that such poison pen letters have been received by many in the town. Despite the fact that many of the accusations are obviously false, recipients are upset by them and fear something worse may happen.

Mrs Symmington, the local solicitor's wife, is found dead after receiving a letter stating that her husband Richard was not the father of her second son. Her body is discovered with the letter, a glass containing potassium cyanide, and a torn scrap of paper that reads, "I can't go on". An inquest rules that Mrs Symmington's death was suicide.

The local police begin a hunt for the anonymous letter writer. A Scotland Yard inspector, brought in to help with the investigation, concludes that the writer must be a middle-aged woman among the prominent citizens of Lymstock.

Mrs Symmington's daughter by a previous marriage, Megan Hunter, an awkward, frumpy 20-year-old, stays with the Burtons for a few days after losing her mother. The Burtons' housekeeper, Partridge, receives a call from Agnes, the Symmingtons' maidservant, who is distraught and seeks advice. Agnes fails to arrive for their planned meeting; nor is she found at the Symmingtons' when Jerry calls in the evening to check on her. The following day, her body is discovered by Megan in the under-stairs cupboard at the Symmington house.

Progress in the murder investigation is slow until the vicar's wife, Mrs Dane Calthrop, invites Miss Marple to investigate. Jerry expounds to her his ideas on why Agnes was killed. Meanwhile, Elsie Holland, governess to the Symmington's two boys, also receives an anonymous letter. The police observe Aimée Griffith, sister of the local doctor Owen Griffith, typing an address on the same typewriter that was used for the poison pen letters, and they arrest her.

Heading to London to see his doctor, Jerry impulsively takes Megan along with him and takes her to Joanna's dressmaker for a complete makeover. Jerry realises he has fallen in love, and when they return to Lymstock, he asks Megan to marry him; she turns him down. He asks Mr Symmington for his permission to court Megan. Miss Marple advises Jerry to leave Megan alone for a day, as she has a task for her.

Megan blackmails her stepfather later that evening, implying that she has proof that he killed Mrs Symmington. Mr Symmington coolly pays her an initial instalment of money, while not admitting his guilt. Later in the night, after giving Megan a sleeping drug, he attempts to murder her by putting her head in the gas oven. Jerry and the police are lying in wait. Jerry rescues Megan, and Symmington confesses. The police arrest him for murdering his wife and Agnes.

Miss Marple, knowing human nature, reveals that she knew all along that the letters were a diversion, and were not written by a local woman, because none contained true accusations – something locals would be sure to gossip about. Only one person benefited from Mrs Symmington's death: her husband. He is in love with the beautiful Elsie Holland. Planning his wife's murder, he modelled the letters on those in a past case known to him from his legal practice. The police theory about who wrote them was completely wrong. The one letter that Symmington did not write was the one to Elsie; Aimée Griffith, who had been in love with Symmington for years, wrote that. Knowing it would be hard to prove Symmington's guilt, Miss Marple devised the scheme to expose him, enlisting Megan to provoke him to attempt to kill her.

Following the successful conclusion of the investigation, Megan realises that she does love Jerry. Jerry buys Miss Barton's house for them. His sister Joanna marries Owen Griffith, and they also remain in Lymstock. Meanwhile, Emily Barton and Aimée Griffith go on a cruise together.

== Principal characters ==
- Jane Marple: amateur sleuth, a shrewd judge of human nature.
- Jerry Burton: wealthy and temporarily disabled pilot. He narrates the story.
- Joanna Burton: Jerry's sister, younger and attractive.
- Miss Emily Barton: owner of 'Little Furze', which she rents to the Burtons.
- Florence Elford: the Barton family's former maid, now married.
- Partridge: maid at 'Little Furze'.
- Beatrice Baker: maid at 'Little Furze'.
- Mrs Baker: mother of Beatrice.
- Inspector Graves: detective from Scotland Yard.
- Superintendent Nash: County Detective Superintendent.
- Mr Richard Symmington: solicitor in Lymstock, second husband to Mona, father of two young sons, and stepfather of Megan Hunter.
- Mrs Mona Symmington: mother of Megan Hunter, and of two young sons with Richard Symmington. She is the first murder victim.
- Miss Megan Hunter: woman of 20, back home for one year from boarding school, coltish, usually shy.
- Elsie Holland: beautiful nanny of the two young Symmington boys.
- Dr Owen Griffith: local doctor in Lymstock.
- Aimée Griffith: sister of Owen, who lives with him in Lymstock.
- Agnes Woddell: house parlourmaid at Symmington home, the second murder victim.
- Rose: the Symmingtons' cook.
- Miss Ginch: Symmington's clerk.
- Reverend Caleb Dane Calthrop: local vicar, academic in his style.
- Mrs Maud Dane Calthrop: the vicar's wife who tries to keep an eye on people.
- Mr Pye: resident of Lymstock who enjoys the scandal raised by the poison pen letters.
- Colonel Appleton: resident of Combeacre, a village about 7 miles from Lymstock.
- Mrs Cleat: woman who lives in Lymstock, described as the local witch.

== Literary significance and reception ==
Christie stated that this book was one of her favourites, saying "I find that another [book] I am really pleased with is The Moving Finger. It is a great test to re-read what one has written some seventeen or eighteen years before. One's view changes. Some do not stand the test of time, others do."

Maurice Willson Disher in The Times Literary Supplement of 19 June 1943 was mostly positive, starting, "Beyond all doubt the puzzle in The Moving Finger is fit for experts" and continued "The author is generous with her clues. Anyone ought to be able to read her secret with half an eye – if the other one-and-a-half did not get in the way. There has rarely been a detective story so likely to create an epidemic of self indulgent kicks." However, some reservations were expressed: "Having expended so much energy on her riddle, the author cannot altogether be blamed for neglecting the other side of her story. It would grip more if Jerry Burton, who tells it, was more credible. He is an airman who has crashed and walks with the aid of two sticks. That he should make a lightning recovery is all to the good, but why, in between dashing downstairs two at a time and lugging a girl into a railway carriage by main force, should he complain that it hurts to drive a car? And why, since he is as masculine in sex as the sons of King Gama does he think in this style, "The tea was china and delicious and there were plates of sandwiches and thin bread and butter and a quantity of little cakes"? Nor does it help verisimilitude that a bawling young female gawk should become an elegant beauty in less than a day."

Maurice Richardson in The Observer wrote: "An atmosphere of perpetual, after-breakfast well-being; sherry parties in a country town where nobody is quite what he seems; difficult slouching daughters with carefully concealed coltish charm; crazy spinsters, of course; and adulterous solicitors. Agatha Christie is at it again, lifting the lid off delphiniums and weaving the scarlet warp all over the pastel pouffe." And he concluded, "Probably you will call Mrs Christie's double bluff, but this will only increase your pleasure."

An unnamed reviewer in the Toronto Daily Star of 7 November 1942 said, "The Moving Finger has for a jacket design a picture of a finger pointing out one suspect after another and that's the way it is with the reader as chapter after chapter of the mystery story unfolds. It is not one of [Christie's] stories about her famous French [sic] detective, Hercule Poirot, having instead Miss Marple, a little old lady sleuth who doesn't seem to do much but who sets the stage for the final exposure of the murderer."

The writer and critic Robert Barnard wrote "Poison pen in Mayhem Parva, inevitably leading to murder. A good and varied cast list, some humour, and stronger than usual romantic interest of an ugly-duckling-into-swan type. One of the few times Christie gives short measure, and none the worse for that."

In the "Binge!" article of Entertainment Weekly of December 2014 – January 2015, the writers picked The Moving Finger as a Christie favourite on the list of the "Nine Great Christie Novels".

== Adaptations ==
=== Television ===
The Moving Finger was first adapted for television by the BBC in two episodes with Joan Hickson in the series Miss Marple. It first aired on 21 and 22 February 1985. The adaptation is generally faithful to the novel, apart from making changes to names: the village of Lymstock became Lymston, the house of Little Furze became The Furze, Mona and Richard Symmington were renamed Angela and Edward Symmington and their sons Colin and Brian were renamed Robert and Jamie, the Reverend Caleb Dane Calthrop became Guy Calthrop, Aimee Griffith became Eryl Griffith and had a much meeker personality, the characters of Agnes and Beatrice were combined and Miss Marple was brought into the story sooner than the novel does. Filming date is early Summer 1984.

A second television adaptation was made with Geraldine McEwan as Miss Marple in the TV series, Agatha Christie's Marple and was filmed in Chilham, Kent. It first aired on 12 February 2006. This adaptation changes the personality of Jerry. The story is set a little later than in the novel, as mentioned in a review of the episode: "Miss Marple, observing the tragic effects of these missives on relationships and reputations, is practically in the background in this story, watching closely as a nihilistic young man (James D'Arcy) comes out of his cynical, alcohol-laced haze to investigate the source of so much misery." and is "set shortly after World War II."

A third adaptation came as part of the French television series Les Petits Meurtres d'Agatha Christie. The episode aired in 2009.

A fourth adaptation was developed in Korea as part of the 2018 television series Ms. Ma, Nemesis.

=== Radio ===
A radio adaptation was broadcast on BBC Radio 4 in May 2001 in the Saturday Play slot, starring June Whitfield as Miss Marple.

== Dedication ==
The work is dedicated to Christie's friends, the artist Mary Winifrid Smith and her husband Sidney Smith, an Assyriologist.

== Publication history ==
UK first edition (1943)

The novel's first true publication was the US serialisation in Collier's Weekly in eight instalments from 28 March (Volume 109, Number 13) to 16 May 1942 (Volume 109, Number 20) with illustrations by Mario Cooper.

The UK serialisation was as an abridged version in six parts in Woman's Pictorial from 17 October (Volume 44, Number 1136) to 21 November 1942 (Volume 44, Number 1141) under the slightly shorter title of Moving Finger. All six instalments were illustrated by Alfred Sindall.

This novel is one of two to differ significantly in American editions (the other being Three Act Tragedy), both hardcover and paperback. Most American editions of The Moving Finger have been abridged by about 9000 words.
