= Mary Winifrid Smith =

British painter

- Born: Mary Winifrid Parker; 29 February 1904; Bury
- Died: 11 September 1992 (aged 88); Dalmeny
- Alma mater: Slade School of Fine Art
- Occupation: Painter, illustrator
- Spouse(s): Sidney Smith
- Children: Harry Smith

Mary Winifrid Smith (1904–1992) was a British painter.

== Life ==
Smith was born Mary Winifrid Parker on 29 February 1904, in Bury, Lancashire, to Helen Durley (née Yates) and her husband Henry Wilfred Parker, being their third child, and only daughter, of four. At the time of the 1911 census, the family lived at The Elms, Walshaw Road, Bury.

Parker was educated at Bury High School, Bury Art School, and then the Slade School of Fine Art from 1923 to 1927, under Henry Tonks and Philip Wilson Steer. While a student, she won the 1926 First Prize (Equal) for a painting, Portrait of a Bearded Old Man, which remains in the collection of University College London, the Slade's parent body. She was offered to opportunity to assist Rex Whistler with the decorations for Cunard's RMS Queen Mary, but declined, being, in her own words, "too shy".

As she was just 19 when she arrived in London, her father asked his cousin, Sidney Smith, a 34-year-old archaeologist and assistant keeper at the British Museum, to take care of her. They married, at Bury, in 1927. The couple's first child, a son, Harry (later a noted Egyptologist), was born in June the following year.

Later that year, after Smith accepted a position in Baghdad with the Assyrian Antiquities Service and the Iraq Museum, he and his wife moved there, leaving Harry in England with a nurse. The couple became friends with Smith's colleague Max Mallowan and his wife, the novelist Agatha Christie. Even after the men's careers diverged, the two women remained friends, with Christie dedicating her novel The Moving Finger (1942) "To my Friends Sydney and Mary Smith". Christie owned Parker's painting New Street, Baghdad (1930), a gift from Parker, which was included when Christie's children donated her home, Greenway, and its contents to the National Trust in 2000. Mallowan refers to the painting in his memoirs.

Smith became Keeper of Egyptian and Assyrian Antiquities at the British Museum in 1930, and so he and Parker returned to London, and a house they purchased at 7, Fellows Road, Belsize Park. Zoe, their daughter, was born there in 1933.

In March 1934, she exhibited jointly with Katherine Hartnell and Lilian Whitehead, for two weeks at the Beaux Arts Gallery.

Many of Parker's canvases were destroyed in a 1941 air raid during World War II, which damaged the Belsize Park house so badly that it was uninhabitable, and later demolished. As a result, the family lived for a while in "No.1 Residence" at the British Museum. Following Smith's retirement from the museum in 1948, to become a professor at University College London, they moved to an apartment at 15 Courtfield Road, South Kensington.

Parker exhibited paintings, including portraits of both of her children, at the Royal Academy, in 1947 and 1948, and then either there or at the New English Art Club most years, until 1965. She was a member of the Women's International Art Club.

As an illustrator, her work often appeared in her husband's publications. The couple retired to Barcombe in 1955.

She died on 11 September 1992 in Dalmeny, New South Wales, having moved to Australia to be with her daughter following Sidney's death in 1979, and her diagnosis with dementia. She was cremated there on 16 September.

== Legacy ==
Her works are in a number of public collections, including:

- Portrait of a Bearded Old Man (1926); University College London, accession LDUCS: PC5103
- New Street, Baghdad (1930); The National Trust. (New Street, Baghdad is now known as "Rashid Street")
- Reflection (the artist's daughter, Zoe) (circa 1948); Bury Art Museum
- Girl with Book (1947); Manchester Art Gallery (also depicts Zoe)
- Sussex Farm, (1962); Lewisham Local History and Archives Centre, originally purchased by London County Council

She variously signed her works, and exhibited, as "Mary W. Parker" (to circa 1939), "Mary Parker Smith", "Mary W. Smith" (up to 1951), or "Mary Smith" (from circa 1951). Some directories thus list her more than once.
