= Stephen Quirke =

Stephen Quirke is an Egyptologist. He is the current Edwards Professor of Egyptian Archaeology and Philology at University College London. He has worked at the British Museum (1989–1998) and since 1999 at the Petrie Museum in London. He has published several books, some of them translated into other languages.

== Works ==
- Hieroglyphs and the Afterlife in Ancient Egypt, London 1996, ISBN 978-0714109954
- The Cult of Ra: Sun-worship in Ancient Egypt: Sun-worship in Ancient Egypt from the Pyramids to Cleopatra, London 2001, ISBN 978-0500051078
- Who Were the Pharaohs?: A Guide to their Names, Reigns and Dynasties, London 2010, ISBN 978-0714131436
- Hidden Hands: Egyptian Workforces in Petrie Excavation Archives, 1880–1924 (Duckworth Egyptology Series), London 2010 ISBN 978-0715639047
- Birth tusks: the armoury of health in context – Egypt 1800 BC., London ISBN 978-1906137496
- (with Gianluca Miniaci Juan Carlos Moreno García, Stephen Quirke & Andréas Stauder (editors)): The Arts of Making in Ancient Egypt, Voices, images, and objects of material producers 2000–1550 BC, Sidestone. Leiden, ISBN 9789088905230
