= Akhnaton (play) =

Play by Agatha Christie

- Original language: English
- Written by: Agatha Christie

Premiere
- Place: United Kingdom

Akhnaton is a play by Agatha Christie. It was written in 1937, around the same time she was writing Death on the Nile. It is set in Ancient Egypt, and followed the exploits of the Egyptian Pharaoh Akhnaton, his wife Nefertiti and his successor Tutankhaton (who would take the name Tutankhamun when he became Pharaoh). In writing the play, Christie was assisted by the eminent Egyptologist Stephen Glanville, who was a friend of both her and her husband, Max Mallowan.

In her 1977 autobiography, Christie confessed that she never thought that the play would be produced but that she simply enjoyed writing plays or writing something different from that which she was used to. There is no record of any serious attempt to get the play staged once it had been written, but Charles Osborne, in his book The Life and Crimes of Agatha Christie puts forward the theory that the publishers thought it not commercial, and was not what the public expected of Agatha Christie, who was seen at the time as purely a writer of crime fiction.

In May 1972, Christie came across the manuscript, and sent it to her publisher in view of the interest in ancient Egypt prompted by the Treasures of Tutankhamun exhibition which ran at the British Museum from 30 March until 30 September of that year, although she admitted that it would be an expensive production to stage. She made minor revisions to her 1937 manuscript and asked that it be published; however there were still major differences between events in the play and what was then known of this time in Egyptian history (such as Akhnaton now being known to have a second wife called Kiya). The play was published by Collins in May 1973. A new, hardcover, facsimile edition of the play was issued in 2009.

The play has been used by some amateur groups and repertory theatres, but is seldom performed. Aside from the commercial issues of the subject matter, the play requires eleven scene changes and over twenty speaking parts.

== Synopsis ==
=== Act One ===
Scene 1 – The Great Courtyard of the Royal Palace of Amenhotep III in the City of No Amon (Thebes): A delegation of Syrians arrive at the palace bringing the shrine of the goddess Ishtar of Nineveh with them in hope that it cures Pharaoh Amenhotep of his illness. The audience is introduced to the High Priest of Amon, Meriptah, and a young soldier Horemheb. Meriptah is loyal to himself, his polytheistic religion of Amon, his country and his Pharaoh, somewhat in that order, whereas Horemheb is a simpler though more honourable man for having equal loyalty to his country and his Pharaoh and through him his religion. Queen Tiye (called Tyi in the play) greets the delegation together with her son, Akhnaton, who is described as a "fragile-looking boy with intelligent eyes". He stays behind and meets Horemheb. Akhnaton is revealed to the audience as an artist, poet and mystic who believes in a world where all men are free and fighting will end through love. He also recognises the goodness in Horemheb, asks for and receives his allegiance. As the scene ends, Meriptah reveals that the Amenhotep has died and that Akhnaton is now Pharaoh.

Scene 2 – A Room in the Palace (Three years later): Tyi is regent of Egypt until Akhnaton comes of age. The young man shows little interest in ruling as his father had done and antagonises Meriptah. It is revealed that it was Tyi who instilled in Akhnaton a dislike of the religion of Amon and a reverence of Ra when he was a child. In conversation with another priest, Ay, Akhnaton realises his destiny and that he is the son of Ra. He gives orders that his barge be prepared for a voyage down the Nile to a spot where he will build a new city to the glory of Ra. Nefertiti is introduced. She and her husband Akhnaton have a genuine love for each other and their only child, a daughter. Tyi warns Nefertiti that she must persuade her husband not to oppose the cult of Amon to any great degree, knowing the danger that such a move would present to him, but she is too loyal to her husband to go against his wishes. Nefertiti's calculating sister, Nezzemut asks her dwarf servant, Para, for a vision of the future through sand divining. Para foretells that Horemheb will one day be Pharaoh and that Nezzemut will be his Queen.

Scene 3 – A bank of the Nile, 300 miles below Thebes (A month later): On his royal barge, Akhnaton decides on the spot for his new city of Horizon (at the site of modern-day Amarna).

=== Act Two ===
Scene 1 – A bank of the Nile in the City of No Amon (eight years later): The populace of the old city are revealed as being angry with the changes that Akhnaton has brought to their country with his attack on the old religion. Meriptah overhears their complaints as he waits for an acolyte, Ptahmose to arrive from Horizon with news of events there. Ptahmose reveals that Tutankhaton is betrothed to Akhnaton's second daughter, Horemheb is now commander of the armies of Egypt and that Ptahmose has an ally in the cunning Nezzemut. Meriptah's plan is the restoration of the old religion and his own power and riches.

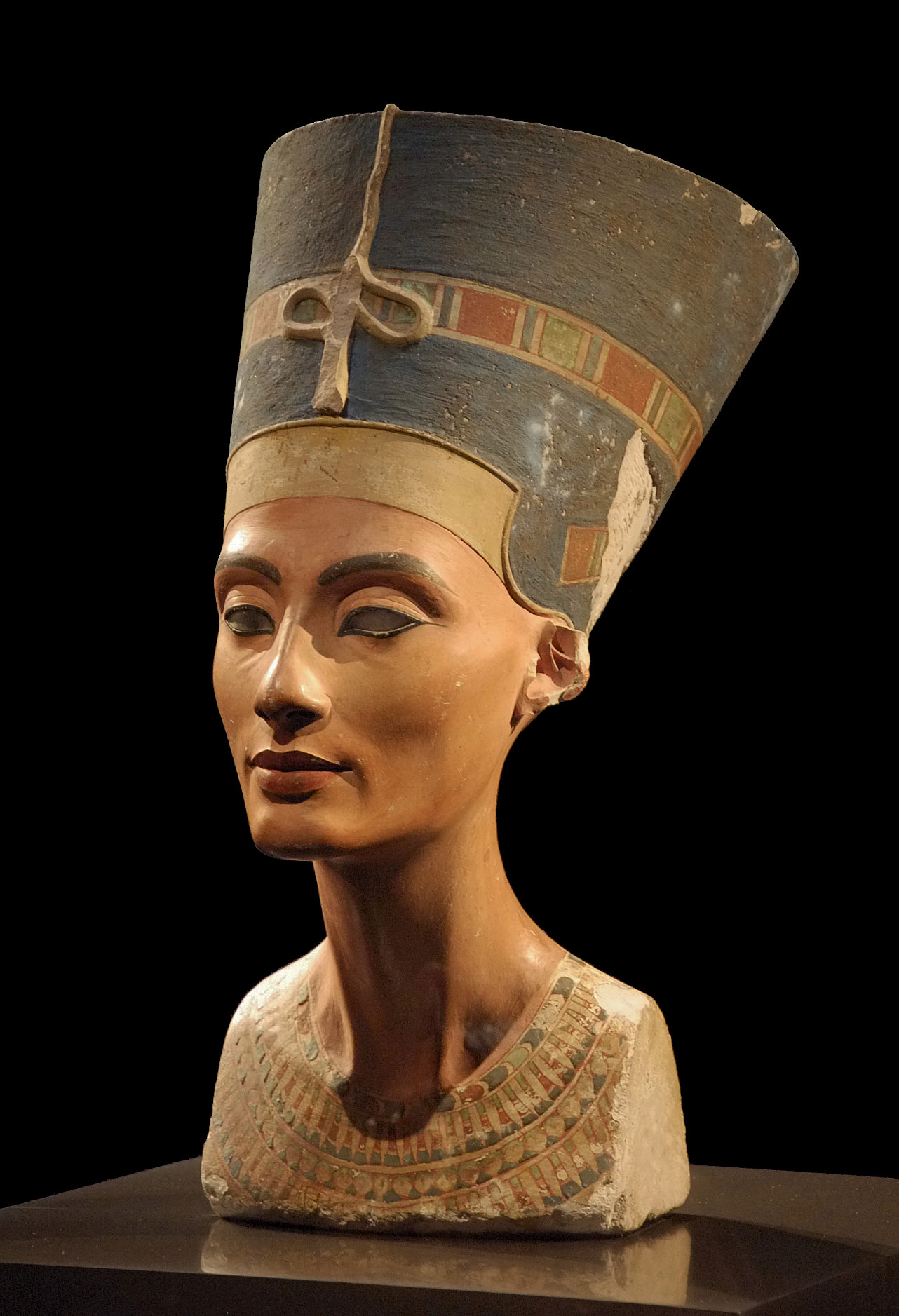
Bust of Nefertiti from Berlin's Altes Museum

Scene 2 – The King's Pavilion in the City of Horizon (six months later): Akhnaton is revealed as the sculptor of the famous bust of Nefertiti (see right). They now have five daughters. Tyi is no longer regent and Akhnaton rules in his own right. Nefertiti dislikes Horemheb, thinking that he dislikes her but Akhnaton's love for the soldier and belief in him is as great as ever. Horemheb himself is worried at the signs of dissent that he sees in Egypt but Akhnaton brushes these worries aside, obsessed with the perfection of the beauty of his new city. Tyi arrives, old and ill. She is deeply concerned about the feelings of the people and particularly the way in which Akhnaton's tax-gatherers rob them of their money. Horemheb is an ally of her worries and promises to watch over Akhnaton. Tyi misses nothing and warns Horemheb to be careful of Nezzemut. Akhnaton receives foreign tributes but declines to impress them with the grandeur they expect. Tyi is scornful that they will see this as a sign of weakness. She recognises Ptahmose in the crowd and tries to warn her son of the spies in his midst but dies before she can do so.

Scene 3 – Horemheb's apartments in the city of Horizon (a year later): Tutankhaton is a good friend of Horemheb and takes instruction from him in the soldier's arts. Two Syrian emissaries arrive to speak with Horemheb. Meriptah has smuggled himself into Horizon and speaks with Tutankhaton and Horemheb, attempting to sow discord over the new religion. News is brought of rebellion in the vassal states of Egypt and riots within its cities. Akhnaton is convinced that the religion of Amon is to blame and issues decrees to wipe all traces of him from Egypt – even from the tombs of the dead. His supporters are just as horrified as his enemies but Akhnaton is determined.

=== Act Three ===
Scene 1 – The King's Pavilion (three years later): Akhnaton is weak and ill, but still believing in the goodness of men, he is still deaf to the pleas of Horemheb who begs to be allowed to deal with the insurrectionists across Egypt and its provinces. Nezzemut tries to convince Horemheb that the Pharaoh is mad. Horemheb, for the best motives, tries to persuade Akhnaton to allow Tutankhaton to rule with him. Akhnaton is now set on a course of monotheism and is determined to obliterate all trace of all gods except Ra from Egypt. This persuades Horemheb that Nezzemut is right and that Akhnaton has lost his sanity.

Scene 2 – A Street in No Amon (six months later): Horemheb and Meriptah hear the people as they mourn the dead who have lost their lives through famine, plague and attack from outside. Horemheb is determined that Egypt will rise again.

Scene 3 – A room in the High Priest's House (the same day): Meriptah, Horemheb, Tutankhaton and Nezzemut plan Akhnaton's overthrow. Horemheb obtains a promise that Akhnaton's life will be spared and that he will be allowed to live with honour for the rest of his life in Horizon. However, Meriptah and Nezzemut plan separately: Tutankhaton will be allowed to live for only a couple of years before he dies and Nezzemut can rule, and Akhnaton must die as Horemheb still has a love for the Pharaoh. Nezzemut will arrange for his death, but tells Meriptah that Nefertiti – who she truly loves – must be unharmed.

Scene 4 – A Room in the Palace of the city of Horizon (a month later): One tragedy after another falls on Akhnaton as he hears of further rebellions across Egypt, as Horemheb tells him that he no longer supports him, that his son-in-law Tutankhaton has turned against him and that the supposedly finished cult of Amon has risen again. He falls into a hysterical fever at these events, prompting Nezzemut to suggest that Para make one of her famous brews (i.e. poison) to calm him. Nefertiti feeds the brew to Akhnaton and is about to drink some herself when a horrified Nezzemut stops her. Nefertiti realises that she has been betrayed and has been tricked into poisoning her husband. Horemheb arrives and is distraught at the events he has caused. Akhnaton dies and Nefertiti herself drinks the brew...

=== Epilogue ===
A Captain reads out a proclamation to a group of stonemasons. The religion of Amon is to be restored to Egypt.

== Publication history ==
- UK by Collins, London, May 1973. ISBN 0-00-211038-5. 157 pages
- US by Dodd, Mead & Co. 1973. ISBN 0-396-06822-7. 157 pages
- HarperCollins; Facsimile edition (reissue) (29 October 2009)
