= Geoffrey Thorndike Martin =

British egyptologist (1934–2022)

Geoffrey Almeric Thorndike Martin (28 May 1934 – 7 March 2022) was a British egyptologist, Edwards Professor of Egyptian Archaeology and Philology Emeritus, University College, London, Joint Field Director of the Amarna Royal Tombs Project and fellow commoner of Christ's College, Cambridge.

== Biography ==
Martin was born in South Ockendon on 28 May 1934. He attended school at Aveley and then Palmer's School in Grays in Essex. Martin received a BA in Ancient History from University College London in 1963. He has the degrees of MA, PhD and Litt. D from Cambridge University and was Budge Research Fellow in Egyptology at Christ's College, Cambridge from 1964 to 1970. After leaving Christ's College Martin became Lecturer in Egyptology at University College London, Reader from 1978 and Edwards Professor of Egyptian Archaeology and Philology from 1988 until retirement in 1993.

Martin's fieldwork was carried out in various locations in Sudan and Egypt. He excavated with the Egypt Exploration Society's mission at Buhen in the Sudan in 1963. With the EES and the National Museum of Antiquities in Leiden and University of Amsterdam he excavated at Saqqara from 1964-68; he was site director from 1970-1974, and field director from 1975 to 1998. He was field director of the Amarna Epigraphic Mission, of the Egypt Exploration Society in 1969 and 1980. From 1998 till 2002 he worked under Nicholas Reeves, Project Director, as Joint Field Director of the Amarna Royal Tombs Project.

Martin died on 7 March 2022, at the age of 87.

== Work ==
Martin was most famous for his discoveries of the tomb of Maya, Tutankhamun's treasurer, and the private tomb of Horemheb, but also more generally for his work in the Valley of the Kings and Saqqara.

The discoveries in Saqqara include Tia, Ramesses the Great's sister and other dignitaries.

== Notable publications ==
- 'Egyptian Administrative and Private-name Seals' (Oxford, 1971)
- 'The Royal Tomb at El-Amarna', I-II (London, 1974, 1989)
- 'The tomb of Hetepka and other Reliefs and Inscriptions from the sacred animal Necropolis North Saqqâra 1964–1973' (London, 1979)
- 'The Sacred Animal Necropolis at North Saqqara' (London, 1981)
- 'Canopic Equipment in the Petrie Museum' (Warminster, 1984) (with Vivien Raisman)
- 'Scarabs, Cylinders and other Egyptian Seals' (Warminster, 1985)
- 'The Tomb Chapels of Paser and Raia' (London, 1985)
- 'Corpus of Reliefs of the New Kingdom', I (London, 1987)
- 'Excavations in the Royal Necropolis at El-Amarna' (Cairo, 1987) (with Aly El-Khouly)
- 'The Memphite Tomb of Horemheb', I, (London, 1989)
- 'The Hidden Tombs of Memphis' (London, 1991)
- 'Bibliography of the Amarna Period and its Aftermath' (London, 1991)
- 'The Tomb of Tia and Tia' (London, 1997)
- 'Stelae from Egypt and Nubia in the Fitzwilliam Museum, Cambridge, C. 3000 BC-AD 1150' (Fitzwilliam Museum Publications, 2005)
- 'Umm el-Qaab VII: Private Stelae of the Early Dynastic Period from the Royal Cemetery at Abydos'. Archäologische Veröffentlichungen, vol. 123 (Harrassowitz, Wiesbaden 2011, ISBN 978-3-447-06256-5).
