= Richard David Barnett =

British archaeologist

Richard David Barnett, CBE, FBA (23 January 1909 – 29 July 1986) was the Keeper, Department of Western Asiatic Antiquities of the British Museum.

== Early life ==
Born on 23 January 1909, Barnett was the son of Lionel David Barnett, who was the Keeper of Oriental Books and Manuscripts at the British Museum from 1908 to 1936. He attended Corpus Christi College, Cambridge. He was a student of British School of Archaeology at Athens from 1930 to 1932.

== Career ==
In 1932, Barnett was appointed an Assistant Keeper in the Department of Egyptian and Assyrian Antiquities at the British Museum. He remained in that office until 1939, when he moved to the Admiralty for war service; after spells there and at the Foreign Office, he served in the RAF from 1942 to 1946. On demobilisation, he returned to his post at the British Museum in 1946 and was promoted to Deputy Keeper in 1953. In 1955, he became Keeper of the department, serving until 1974. He then spent the 1974-75 year as a visiting professor at the Hebrew University of Jerusalem.

Barnett was elected a Fellow of the British Academy in 1962 and appointed a Commander of the Order of the British Empire in 1974. He served as president of the Jewish Historical Society of England from 1959 to 1961 and chairman of the Anglo-Israel Archaeological Society between 1968 and 1986. He died on 29 July 1986.

== Publications ==
- (ed) Treasures of a London Temple, 1951
- (with Sir Leonard Woolley) British Museum Excavations at Carchemish, Vol. III, 1952
- Catalogue of Nimrud Ivories in the British Museum, 1957, 2nd edn 1975
- (trans.) The Jewish sect of Qumran and the Essenes (by J. Dupont-Sommer), 1954
- Barnett, Richard David; Forman, Werner; Museum, British (1960), Assyrian palace reliefs and their influence on the sculptures of Babylonia and Persia, [London] Batchworth Press, OCLC 406410
- Barnett, Richard David; Museum, British (1966), Illustrations of Old Testament history, London, British Museum, OCLC 1237822
- (with M. Falkner) The Sculptures of Tiglath-pileser III, 1962, 2nd edn, 1970
- Barnett, Richard David (1971), The Sephardi heritage; essays on the history and cultural contribution of the Jews of Spain and Portugal, New York, Ktav Pub. House, ISBN 978-0-87068-170-7
- Barnett, Richard David; Jewish Museum (London, England) (1974), Catalogue of the permanent and loan collections of the Jewish Museum, London, Published for the Jewish Museum by Harvey Miller, ISBN 978-0-85602-010-0
- Barnett, Richard David; Lorenzini, Amleto; Museum, British (1975), Assyrian sculpture in the British Museum, McClelland and Stewart, ISBN 978-0-7710-5345-0
- Barnett, Richard David; Museum, British (1976), Sculptures from the north palace of Ashurbanipal at Nineveh (668-627 B.C.), British Museum Publications Ltd. for the Trustees of the British Museum, ISBN 978-0-7141-1046-2
- Barnett, Richard David (1982), Ancient ivories in the Middle East, Qedem, 14; Publications of the Institute of Archaeology, the Hebrew University of Jerusalem, Institute of Archaeology, Hebrew University of Jerusalem, OCLC 9032788

Cultural offices
Preceded by C. J. Gadd (Keeper of Egyptian and Assyrian Antiquities)	Keeper of the Department of Western Asiatic Antiquities; British Museum; 1955–1974	Succeeded by Edmond Sollberger
