= Ali Suefi =

Egyptian archaeologist

Ali Mohamed es-Suefi (fl. 1890–1938) was an Egyptian archaeologist. He worked with William Flinders Petrie starting in 1890 and for several decades played a crucial role in numerous archaeological projects across Egypt, often serving as the head overseer (reis) of the Egyptian workforce. Petrie referred to him as his "best lad".

Suefi's archaeological career began at the excavations at Meidum in 1890, near his home village of Lahun in the Faiyum region, where he also worked as a farmer and fisherman.

A 1937 painting titled The house of reis Ali es Suefi and his family at Armant by Vahram Manavyan was donated by Margaret Stefana Drower to the Egypt Exploration Society in 2004.

Artifacts he discovered or helped dig can be found predominantly at the Petrie Museum of Egyptian Archaeology in London. Additional information about Suefi's contributions to Egyptian archaeology were added to the Petrie Museum's entrance gallery during renovations in 2019.
