= John Tresidder Sheppard =

British classical scholar (1881–1968)

Sir John Tresidder Sheppard MBE
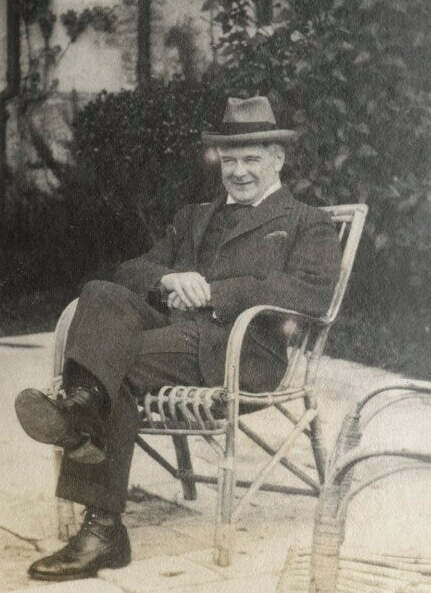
- Sheppard in 1922

36th Provost of King's College, Cambridge
- In office 1933–1954
- Preceded by: Alan Brooke
- Succeeded by: Stephen Glanville

Personal details
- Born: John Tresidder Sheppard; 7 November 1881
- Died: 7 May 1968 (aged 86)

Academic background
- Education: Dulwich College
- Alma mater: King's College, Cambridge

Academic work
- Discipline: Classics
- Sub-discipline: Ancient Greek literature; Greek tragedy

Sir John Tresidder Sheppard, MBE (7 November 1881 – 7 May 1968) was a British classicist and academic, who was the first non-Etonian to become the provost of King's College, Cambridge.

== Early life ==
John Sheppard was educated at Dulwich College. He went up to King's College, Cambridge, where he studied Classics and won the Porson Prize. His subject tutors included Walter Headlam and Nathaniel Wedd, but he was also influenced by the historian Oscar Browning. He achieved first class honours in part I of the Classical Tripos in 1902, but only second class honours in part II in 1904. His "zeal" as president of the Cambridge Union likely affected his final classification. He graduated from the University of Cambridge with a Bachelor of Arts (BA) degree in 1904.

== Career ==
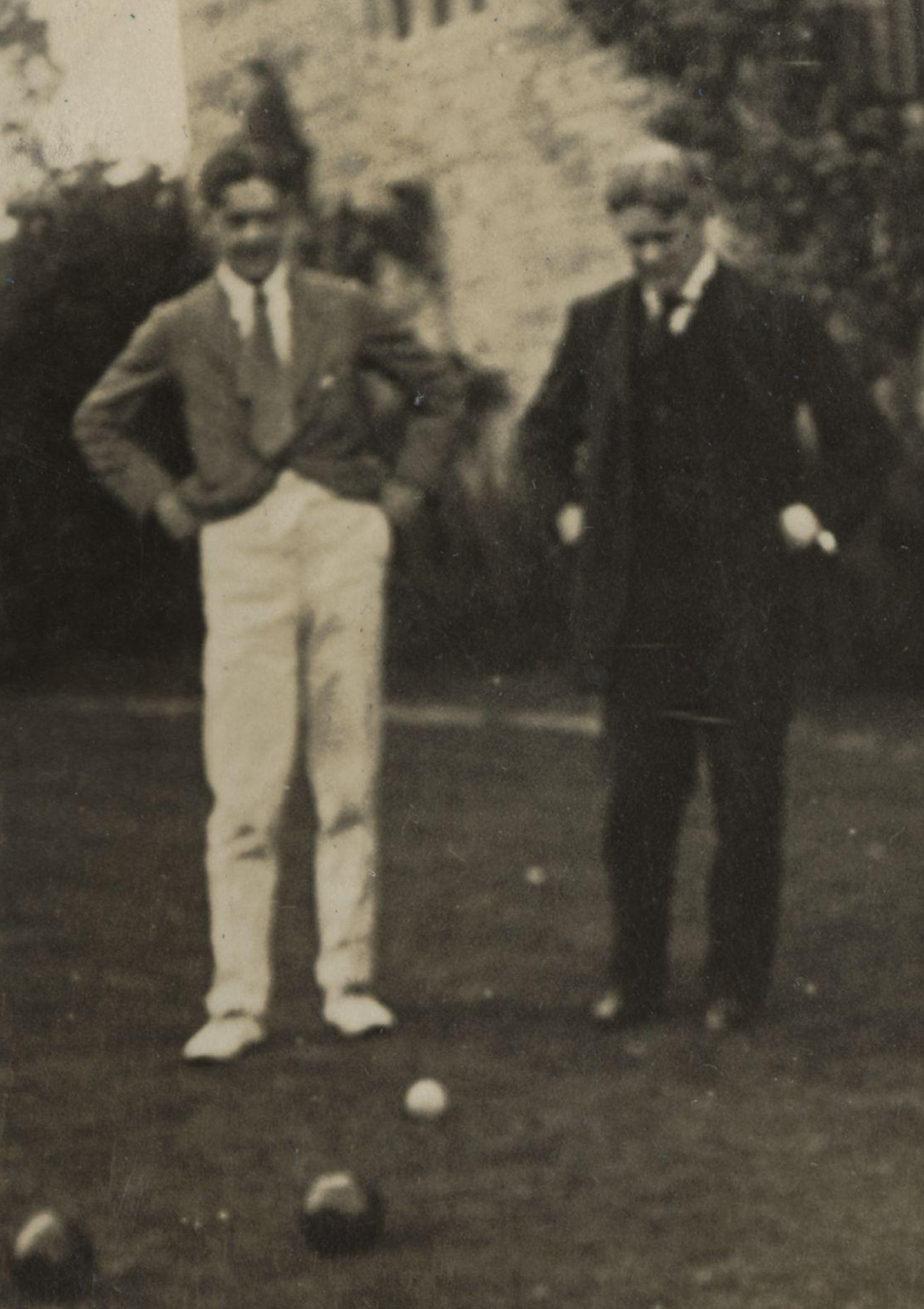
Sheppard (right) with T.S. Eliot in 1920

After graduating with his undergraduate degree, Sheppard began his academic career teaching classics at Emmanuel College, Cambridge. In 1906, he was elected a fellow of his alma mater King's College, Cambridge. He published his first book Greek Tragedy in 1911. He was a lecturer in classics King's College from 1908 to 1933. He additionally taught in the Faculty of Classics, as Brereton Reader in Classics from 1931 to 1947. He was made vice-provost of his college in 1929, and was elected unanimously as provost in 1933. His term as head of the college was extended by two additional years, and he retired in 1954.

During his long career, he translated many famous Greek classics, and published several books on the subject, including The Pattern of the Iliad, Greek Tragedy, and Aeschylus & Sophocles: Their Work and Influence. He loved to share his knowledge with others, and a "school had only to ask" for him to attend to give a lecture on Greek literature to both boys and girls. He also produced the Cambridge Greek Play eleven times during his time at the university.

During the First World War, he was a deputy assistant censor in the War Office, for which he was appointed Member of the Order of the British Empire (MBE) in 1919. In 1934, he was made a Knight Commander of the Order of the Redeemer by the modern state of Greece. In the 1950 King's Birthday Honours, he was made a Knight Bachelor "for services to the study of Greek literature" and was therefore granted the title sir.

Sheppard was a member of the Cambridge Apostles.

== Personal life ==
John Sheppard was openly homosexual. He never married.

Sheppard died on 7 May 1968 in London, England, aged 86. His funeral service was held on 19 May 1968, after which he was cremated, and his ashes are in a vault in King's College Chapel.

Academic offices
Preceded by Alan England Brooke	Provost of King's College, Cambridge; 1933 to 1954	Succeeded by Stephen Glanville
