= E. S. Drower =

British cultural anthropologist

Ethel Stefana Drower
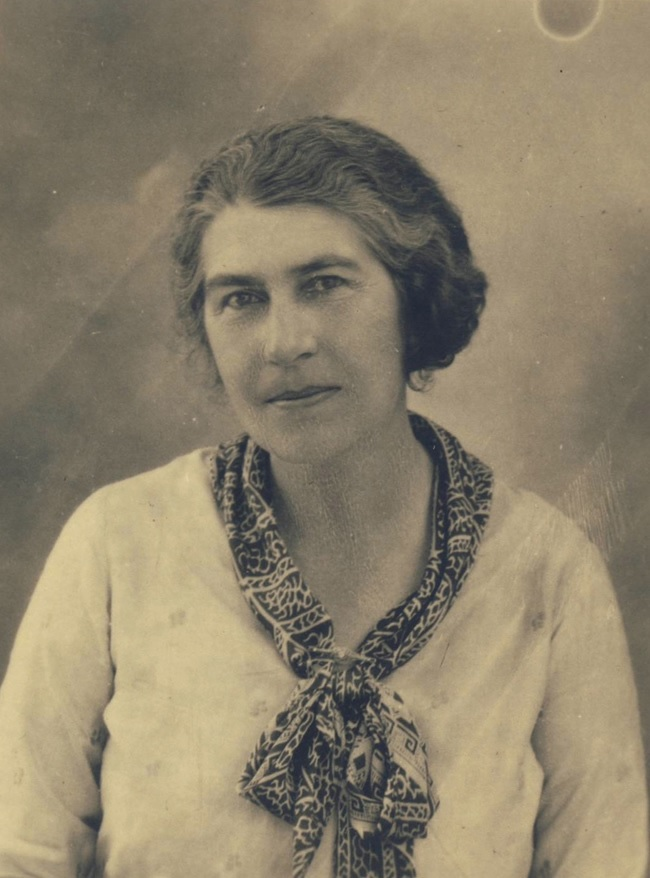
- E. S. Drower in Baghdad during the late 1920s
- Born: Ethel May Stefana Stevens; 1 December 1879
- Died: 27 January 1972 (aged 92)
- Citizenship: British
- Spouse: Sir Edwin Drower
- Children: Margaret Stefana Drower, William Mortimer Drower, Denys Drower
- Scientific career
- Fields: Mandaic studies, cultural anthropology, novelist

Ethel, Lady Drower (née Ethel May Stefana Stevens; 1 December 1879 – 27 January 1972) was a British cultural anthropologist, orientalist and novelist who studied the Middle East and its cultures. She was and is still considered one of the primary specialists on the Mandaeans, and was a dedicated collector of Mandaean manuscripts.

== Biography ==
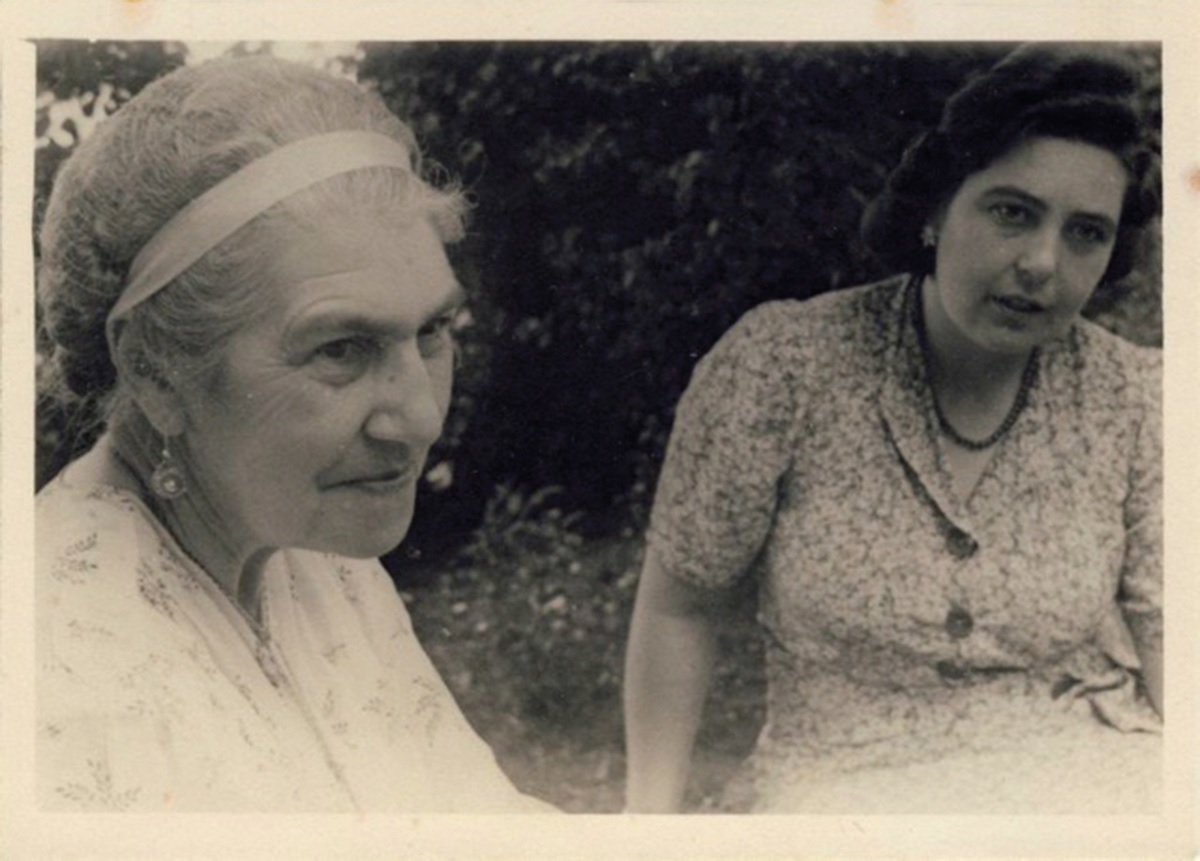
E. S. Drower and her daughter Margaret Stefana Drower in Baghdad during the early 1940s

The daughter of a clergyman, in 1906, she was working for Curtis Brown, a London literary agency when she signed Arthur Ransome to write Bohemia in London.

In 1911, she married Edwin Drower and after his knighthood became Lady Drower. As E. S. Stevens, she wrote a series of romantic novels for Mills & Boon and other publishers. In 1921, she accompanied her husband to Iraq where Sir Edwin Drower was adviser to the Justice Minister from 1921 to 1947. Among her grandchildren was the campaigning journalist Roly Drower.

Her works include the comprehensive description and display of the last practising gnostic Mandaeans' rituals, rites, and customs in The Mandaeans of Iraq and Iran: Their Cults, Customs, Magic, Legends, and Folklore, The Canonical Prayerbook of the Mandaeans (a translation of the Qolasta), The Secret Adam: A Study of Nasoraean Gnosis, and The Peacock Angel (novel about the Yezidis), editions of unique manuscripts such as astronomical divinations (omen) (The Book of the Zodiac) and magical texts (A Book of Black Magic; A Phylactery for Rue), and relevant translations of Mandaean religious works such as The Haran Gawaita and the Baptism of Hibil-Ziwa and The Coronation of the Great Šišlam. Drower's final major work titled Mass and Masiqta or Messiah, Mass and Masiqta remains unpublished to this day, and it is unclear if the full manuscript exists.

Before her scholarly activity, "Already under her maiden name of Ethel Stefana Stevens, Lady Drower had been inspired by the Orient. Between 1909 and 1927, she published 13 novels, and she was the author of two delectable books of travel."

Ethel, Lady Drower died on 27 January 1972, aged 92. She was survived by her children, including daughter, Margaret "Peggy" Hackforth-Jones, and other family members.

== Awards and honors ==
Drower received several honours for her scholarly contributions:

- Honorary DLitt from Oxford University
- Honorary DD from Uppsala University
- Honorary Fellow of the School of Oriental and African Studies of London University
- The Lidzbarski Gold Medal from the German Oriental Society in January 1964 for her work on the Mandaeans and their literary transmission on 1 October 1964

== Drower Collection ==
The Drower Collection (DC), held at the Bodleian Library in Oxford University, is the most extensive collection of Mandaean manuscripts. The collection consists of 55 manuscripts, many of which Drower had obtained through the Mandaean priest Sheikh Negm bar Zahroon.

Drower donated MSS. Drower 1-53 to the Bodleian Library in 1958. MS. Drower 54, The Coronation of the Great Šišlam, was given to the library by Lady Drower in 1961. MS. Drower 55, Lady Drower's personal notebook, was added in 1986.

After her death, some of Drower's private notebooks were obtained by Rudolf Macúch. These notebooks are not part of the Bodleian Library's Drower Collection.

MS. DC 2, which was copied by Sheikh Negm for Drower in 1933, mentions the Mandaean baptismal name (i.e., spiritual name given by a Mandaean priest, as opposed to a birth name) of E. S. Drower as Klila pt Šušian (Classical Mandaic: ࡊࡋࡉࡋࡀ ࡐࡕ ࡔࡅࡔࡉࡀࡍ, lit. 'Wreath, daughter of Susan'), as her middle name Stefana means 'wreath' in Greek. MS. DC 26, a manuscript copied by copied by Sheikh Faraj for Drower in 1936, contains two qmahas (exorcisms). MS. DC 26 is dedicated to Drower's daughter, Margaret ("Peggy"), who is given the Mandaean baptismal name Marganita pt Klila (Classical Mandaic: ࡌࡀࡓࡂࡀࡍࡉࡕࡀ ࡐࡕ ࡊࡋࡉࡋࡀ, lit. 'Pearl, daughter of Wreath') in the text.

== Letters ==
In 2012, Jorunn Jacobsen Buckley published a compiled collection of E. S. Drower's letters. The book includes texts of Drower's correspondence with Cyrus H. Gordon, Rudolf Macuch, Sidney H. Smith, Godfrey R. Driver, Samuel H. Hooke, and Franz Rosenthal.

== Bibliography ==
=== Works as E. S. Stevens ===
- The Veil: A Romance of Tunis, New York, F.A. Stokes, 1909.
- The Mountain of God, London, Mills & Boon, 1911.
- Two works reviewing the Baháʼí Faith in 1911 - "Abbas Effendi: His Personality, Work, and Followers" in Fortnightly Review, and "The Light in the Lantern" in Everybody's Magazine.
- The Long Engagement, New York, Hodder & Stoughton, 1912.
- The Lure, New York, John Lane, 1912.
- Sarah Eden, London, Mills & Boon, 1914.
- Allward, London, Mills & Boon, 1915.
- "--And What Happened", London, Mills & Boon, 1916.
- The Safety Candle, London, Cassell and Company, 1917.
- Magdalene: A Study in Methods, London, Cassell, 1919.
- By Tigris and Euphrates, London, Hurst & Blackett, 1923.
- Sophy: A Tale of Baghdad, London, Hurst & Blackett, 1924.
- Cedars, Saints and Sinners in Syria, London, Hurst & Blackett, 1926.
- The Losing Game, London, Hurst & Blackett, 1926.
- Garden of Flames, New York, F.A. Stokes, 1927.
- Ishtar, London, Hurst & Blackett, 1927.
- Folk-Tales of Iraq, set down and translated from the vernacular by E. S. Stevens, New York, B. Blom, 1971.

=== Works as E. S. Drower ===
- The Mandaeans of Iraq and Iran: Their Cults, Customs, Magic, Legends, and Folklore, Oxford: Clarendon Press, 1937.
- Peacock Angel: Being Some Account of Votaries of a Secret Cult and Their Sanctuaries, London: J. Murray, 1941.
- Water into Wine: A Study of Ritual Idiom in the Middle East, London: Murray, 1956.
- The Secret Adam: A Study of Nasoraean Gnosis, Oxford: Clarendon Press, 1960.
- A Mandaic Dictionary with Rudolf Macuch, Oxford: Clarendon Press, 1963.
- Drower's Folk-Tales of Iraq, edited by Jorunn Jacobsen Buckley, Piscataway, N.J.: Gorgias Press, 2007.

=== Translations as E. S. Drower ===
- The Book of the Zodiac = Sfar malwašia: D. C. 31, Oriental Translation Fund XXXVI; London: Royal Asiatic Society, 1949.
- Šarḥ ḏ qabin ḏ šišlam rba (D. C. 38). Explanatory Commentary on the Marriage Ceremony of the great Šišlam, text transliterated and translated, Rome: Ponteficio Istituto Biblico, 1950.
- Diwan Abatur or Progress Through the Purgatories, text with translation notes and Appendices, Città del Vaticano: Biblioteca apostolica vaticana, 1950.
- The Haran Gawaita and the Baptism of Hibil-Ziwa: the Mandaic text reproduced, together with translation, notes and commentary, Città del Vaticano: Biblioteca apostolica vaticana, 1953.
- Mandaeans. Liturgy and Ritual. The Canonical Prayerbook of the Mandaeans, translated with notes, Leiden: Brill, 1959.
- Alf trisar šuialia. The Thousand and Twelve Questions: A Mandaean Text, edited in transliteration and translation, Berlin: Akademie-Verlag, 1960.
- The Coronation of the Great Šišlam, Leiden: Brill, 1962.
- A Pair of Naṣoraean Commentaries: Two Priestly Documents, the Great First World and the Lesser First World, translated, Leiden: Brill, 1963.
