= Corpus of Romanesque Sculpture in Britain and Ireland =

British digital humanities project

The Corpus of Romanesque Sculpture in Britain and Ireland (CRSBI) is an ongoing web-based research tool that freely provides expert reports and photographs of Romanesque sculpture carved in the British Isles between the mid-11th century and the end of the 12th century. It is a major project whose images are one of the Visual Arts Data Service's educational collections, and has been used by Warwick University's History of Art Department as an Undergraduate Research Support Scheme. It is a registered charity (1168535) with a board of trustees chaired by Prof. Neil Stratford.

== History ==
The project was the brainchild of George Zarnecki who arrived in the United Kingdom in 1943 before spending his career at the Courtauld Institute of Art, retiring in 1982 as a professor and Deputy Director. His thesis, entitled Regional Schools of English Sculpture in the Twelfth Century, provided a framework for the subject, and through his teaching and research he almost single-handedly established English Romanesque sculpture as a subject worthy of study. Throughout his career he kept his work on handwritten file cards, one or more for each site he visited, and after his retirement he set about establishing a similarly systematic approach to the whole of the British Isles using volunteers to complete a comprehensive Corpus. The official starting date of this project was 1988, when Zarnecki and Neil Stratford, the Keeper of Medieval and Later Antiquities at the British Museum, approached the British Academy to ask for money to set it up. The Academy agreed a small initial grant, and the project has been supported by that organisation ever since. The first chairman was Professor Peter Lasko, ex-Director of the Courtauld Institute, and the stated aim was ‘to photograph and record in a searchable database all of the surviving stone sculpture produced c.1066 - c.1200 in Britain and Ireland’.

CRSBI was recognised as an important development in Romanesque studies. In Kahn’s words, "it is worth noting an important decision: the British Academy's adoption of a project (the Corpus of Romanesque Sculpture in the British Isles), which should lead to a complete recension of the works concerned..."

A management board was recruited to supervise, consisting of eminent scholars of medieval art and architecture.

Volunteer fieldworkers, many of them Zarnecki's former students, were recruited for Scotland, Wales, and each of the English counties and a team led by Professor Roger Stalley of Trinity College Dublin undertook to record the Irish material. Initially, photography was on film, largely black and white, and photographs were scanned and digitised. The number of sites to be covered was estimated to be around 5,000, with perhaps 10-12 photographs per site on average.

== Publishing the fieldwork ==
The British Academy suggested that the only hope for publishing the fieldwork lay in computing, and supplied an expert to help in Seamus Ross, the digital humanities researcher, who encouraged the project team to archive the text reports and digitised photographs separately. This, he argued, would simplify matters when they were eventually brought together.

In the spring of 1998 a pilot site was made available on the internet, containing information about the project and a few sample site entries with images. By 2001-02, site reports from the first counties were online: Berkshire, Sussex, Warwickshire, Bedfordshire and Worcestershire. The website also included a glossary and a guide to the complexities of chevron ornament.

== Hosting the project ==
Initially the project was based at the Courtauld Institute, but in 2007 a change in their research policy led to a move to the Centre for Computing in the Humanities (later renamed the Department of Digital Humanities) at King’s College London, supported by its director, Harold Short who had joined the CRSBI committee to provide much-needed IT expertise. By this time the importance of IT to the humanities was well established, and the CRSBI was the subject of a paper in The Expert Seminar (2006), published two years later. The project has since left King’s College to become a virtual entity. Fieldworkers are responsible for putting their own research online, via to a system supplied by iBase Media Services, who work closely with the CRSBI.

Meanwhile the coverage has increased to cover more than 60 percent of the total identified sites (67 percent in England), and the CRSBI is recognised as a valuable resource for students and their teachers, historians, art historians conservators and heritage bodies worldwide.
