= Sidney Smith (Assyriologist) =

Sidney Smith (29 August 1889 – 12 June 1979) was an Assyriologist (both a linguist and archeologist) who has been described as the architect of Mesopotamian studies.

== Life ==
He was born in Leeds, 29 August 1889, studied in City of London School, and went to Queens' College, Cambridge on a Classical Exhibition. During WWI he served as a subaltern in an infantry battalion. In 1955 he retired to Barcombe, near Lewes in Sussex.

Smith was married to Mary (née Parker) (born 1904), the daughter of his cousin Henry Wilfred Parker, in 1927. Together they had one son, Harry Smith, an Egyptologist and academic, and one daughter.

== Work ==
His life's work focussed on Semitic philology, political geography and Mesopotamian archaeology. He was appointed to the British Museum in 1914, but took up his post in 1919, eventually becoming the Keeper of Egyptian and Assyrian Antiquities (1931–48). He was active in teaching, being a lecturer in Accadian Assyriology (1924–38) at King's College, London. This overlapped with appointments at the new Institute of Archaeology (University of London) from 1934.

He was the Director of Antiquities and Director of the Iraq Museum (1926–31). While there, he and his wife befriended Smith's colleague Max Mallowan and his wife, the novelist Agatha Christie, with Christie dedicating her novel The Moving Finger (1942) "To my Friends Sydney and Mary Smith".

His work was recognised when he was elected a Fellow of the British Academy in 1941.

He retired from British Museum on grounds of ill-health in 1948, but then immediately took up the Chair of Ancient Semitic Languages and Civilization at University College London.

… for him to be intellectually wrong was to be morally wrong. That made him a difficult colleague but a most stimulating teacher

— Mallowan, Mallowan's memoirs

== Selected publications ==
- Smith, S. (1924). Babylonian historical texts relating to the capture and downfall of Babylon. London: Methuen.
- Smith, S. (1940). Alalakh and Chronology. London: Luzac.

Cultural offices
Preceded by Henry Hall	Keeper of the Department of Egyptian and Assyrian Antiquities, British Museum; 1931–1948	Succeeded by C. J. Gadd
