= Edwards Professor of Egyptian Archaeology and Philology =

The Edwards Professor of Egyptian Archaeology and Philology is a university professorial chair held at University College London.

== History ==
The chair was founded on the death of Amelia Edwards of the Egyptian Exploration Fund in 1892, who bequeathing her collection of Egyptian antiquities to University College London, together with a sum of £2,500 to found an Edwards Chair of Egyptology. Her protégé, William Matthew Flinders Petrie, was the first to take the chair.

== Incumbents ==
- 1892–1933: Professor Sir William Matthew Flinders Petrie
- 1934–1946: Stephen Glanville
- 1951–1970: Walter Bryan Emery
- 1970–1986: Harry S. Smith
- 1988–1993: Geoffrey Thorndike Martin
- 1994–2010: John W. Tait
- Current: Stephen Quirke
