= Sir Herbert Thompson Professor of Egyptology =

The Sir Herbert Thompson Professor of Egyptology represents the chair of Egyptology at the University of Cambridge, England.

- Stephen Glanville, 1946–1956
- Jack Plumley, 1957–1977
- John Ray, 2005–2013
- Hratch Papazian, 2013–Present
