= Jane Portal =

British art historian

Jane Virginia Portal BA, MA, FSA (née Bowerman, born 1955) is a specialist in Chinese and Korean art history, and is Keeper of the Department of Asia at the British Museum.

== About ==
Portal was born in Mtarfa, Malta, where her father served in the British Navy. After attending Maidstone Girls' Grammar School, where she was Head Girl, she studied Chinese at Girton College, Cambridge (BA, 1978; MA 2000), and Korean at the School of Oriental and African Studies (BA, 1996). She studied Chinese archaeology at Peking University, 1979-1980 (the first British student to do so), and a year studying Korean at Yonsei University, Seoul, 1994–1995.

== Career ==
Portal worked as Curator of Chinese and Korean Collections at the British Museum, 1987–2008, creating the Korea Foundation Gallery (the museum's first gallery of Korean art) in 2000. In 2001 and 2002, she made two visits to North Korea, following the establishment of diplomatic relations, and started collecting contemporary works from the DPRK for the British Museum. In 2007, she curated the exhibition "The First Emperor: China's Terracotta Army", which attracted a record-breaking 850,000 visitors and won the Art Fund's exhibition of the year award.

From 2008 to 2014, Portal was the Matsutaro Shoriki Chair of Asia, Oceania, and Africa at the Museum of Fine Arts Boston, where she oversaw new galleries for South Asia, Oceania, and Benin, as well as many Asian exhibitions. In December 2014, she returned to the British Museum, where she led the renovation and redisplay of the Sir Joseph Hotung Gallery of China and South Asia, opened by Queen Elizabeth II in November 2017, and oversaw the redisplay of the Mitsubishi Corporation Japanese Galleries, which re-opened in 2018.

== Selected publications ==
- Precious beyond Measure. A History of Korean Ceramics (London: Reaktion Books, 2024) (with Beth McKillop) ISBN 9781789148671
- Arts of Korea: MFA Highlights (Boston: MFA Publications 2012)
- The Terracotta Warriors (London, British Museum Press 2007)
- The First Emperor: China’s Terracotta Army (exhibition catalogue; editor and contributor), (London, British Museum Press 2007); (Cambridge MA, Harvard University Press 2007); (Atlanta, High Museum of Art 2008)
- Chinese Art in Detail (with Carol Michaelson) (London, British Museum Press 2006); (Cambridge MA, Harvard University Press 2007)
- Art Under Control in North Korea (London: Reaktion Books in association with British Museum Press, 2005); (Chicago, University of Chicago Press 2005); Korean edition (Keelsan Books, Seoul 2005)
- Chinese Calligraphy. Standard Script for Beginners (with Qu Leilei) (London: British Museum Press, 2004)
- Chinese Love Poetry (London: British Museum Press, 2004)
- North Korean Culture and Society. British Museum Research Publication 151 (ed., with Beth McKillop) (London: The British Museum, 2004)
- Korea: Art and Archaeology (London, British Museum Press 2000)
- 'Korean Celadons of the Koryo Dynasty’ pp 98–103 in I. Freestone and D. Gaimster (eds) Pottery in the Making: Ceramic Traditions (London: British Museum Press, 1997)
- ‘Decorative Arts for Display’ and ‘Luxuries for Trade’ (with Jessica Rawson) in Jessica Rawson (ed) The British Museum Book of Chinese Art (London: British Museum Press, 1992). (Winner of the National Art Book Prize in 1993)
