= Neil Stratford =

Neil Stratford FSA (b. 26 April 1938), a London born medievalist and Keeper Emeritus of Medieval and Later Antiquities at the British Museum, is recognised as a leading authority on Romanesque and Gothic art and sculpture. He was one of the founding members of the Corpus of Romanesque Sculpture in Britain and Ireland and is the Herbert Franke Chair at the Académie des Inscriptions et Belles-Lettres where he is an elected foreign member.

== Education ==
Educated at Manor House School, Horsham from 1946 to 1951 and then Marlborough College, where he studied Classics, Neil Stratford was conscripted into the Coldstream Guards for his mandatory two year period of National Service (1956–58) before continuing his education. He went up to Magdalene College, Cambridge to read for a BA, graduating in 1961, and then onto study at the Courtauld Institute of Art. It was here that his interest in Romanesque sculpture was kindled and he undertook research for a dissertation on the Romanesque sculpture at the Abbey Church of La Madeleine, Vézelay, supervised by the medievalist Christopher Hohler.

== Career ==
Stratford lectured at Westfield College before he was appointed to the position of Keeper of Medieval and Later Antiquities at the British Museum; a post he held from 1975 until his retirement from museum life in 1998.

During this time Stratford not only published a number of books and articles but was also on the Selection Committee for the exhibition English Romanesque Art 1066–1200 held at the Hayward Gallery, London in 1984, for which George Zarnecki was the lead curator. Stratford and Zarnecki worked together again in 1988 when they were instrumental in founding the Corpus of Romanesque Sculpture in Great Britain and Ireland (CRSBI) following their submission of a proposal for funding to the British Academy who continue to oversee the project. Stratford is currently its Chairman and also presented the online 2020 CRSBI Annual Lecture ‘Cluny and Vézelay: The Paradox of the Romanesque Capital in Burgundy’. Stratford edited the two volume festschrift for George Zarnecki, published in 1987 for his 70th birthday in 1985, and, in the forward, acknowledged his regard for Zarnecki, who he said “has quite literally rewritten a whole chapter of England’s artistic history, taking the sculpture and “minor arts” of the Norman period and placing them firmly in the wider spectrum of European Romanesque”.

Stratford was appointed the Leverhulme Senior Research Fellow at the British Academy in 1991, and worked on the international project, Corpus de la sculpture de Cluny as Chairman of the Scientific Committee. The research was published under his editorship alongside Brigitte Maurice-Chabard & David Walsh. In an interview with Alicia Guzman for the University of Rochester 2010-2011 Newsletter, David Walsh recalls how he met Neil Stratford, who was visiting the excavation at Bordesley Abbey, on which Walsh had been working since 1972. Stratford later asked Walsh to meet him at the British Museum and invited him to participate in a new project involving the Abbey of Cluny in Burgundy and the publication of the findings of the excavation work. Following twenty years of field work and writing, the work was finally published in 2010.

Following his retirement from the British Museum, Stratford has continued to publish articles and books both in French and English and has been honoured for his work on both sides of the Channel. He is celebrated in France, not only for his work at Cluny, but for his work on the chronology of the Burgundian Romanesque sculptures at Vézelay and the Cathédrale Saint-Lazare d'Autun. He was awarded the gold medal by the French Archaeological Society in 2011 (see below). He was a Member of the Institute for Advanced Study, Princeton in 1998 and Visiting Professor of medieval art and archaeology at the École Nationale des Chartes in Paris in 2002/3. He has also spent time at the École Pratique des Hautes Études IVth section, (2001-2) and Florida State University in Tallahassee.

In 2014 Stratford was on the Advisory Panel and a contributor to the British Archaeological Association’s biennial series of International Romanesque Conferences held in Barcelona, ‘Romanesque Patrons and Processes. Design and Instrumentality in the Art and Architecture of Romanesque Europe’.

His knowledge on ivories particularly the Lewis Chessmen, for which he undertook research for the British Museum publication, is still sought after and he provided Sotheby’s Auction House with an historical account of the discovery of the Lewis Chessmen in the 19th century for inclusion in its catalogue when a missing piece was discovered and sold for £735,000 in July 2019.

Stratford took photographs for the Corpus de la sculpture de Cluny publication and, photographs attributed to him, are also held in the Conway Library, whose archive, of mainly architectural images, is in the process of being digitised as part of the wider Courtauld Connects project.

=== Honours and appointments ===
Fellow of the Society of Antiquaries of London, appointed 1 January 1976

Chairman of the Fabric Advisory Committee of St Albans Cathedral 1995

Grand prix de La Société Française d’Archéologie in 2011

Honorary foreign correspondent of the Société Nationale des Antiquaires de France (Paris), elected 3 October 2018

Foreign Member of the Académie des Inscriptions et Belles-Lettres from 2020, having formerly been a foreign associate elected 7 December 2012

== Selected publications ==
- ‘The Hospital, England and Sigena: A footnote’ in Romanesque Patrons and Processes, eds. Jordi Camps, Manuel Castiñeiras, John McNeill and Richard Plant, Abingdon : Routledge, 2018, ISBN 9781138477032
- Corpus de la sculpture de Cluny, 1: Les parties orientales de la Grande Église Cluny III, 2 volumes, Neil Stratford, Brigitte Maurice-Chabard & David Walsh, Paris : Picard, 2010, ISBN 9780000084453
- Cluny 910-2010. Onze Siècles de Rayonnement, edited by Neil Stratford, Paris : Editions du Patrimoine, 2010, ISBN 9782757701126
- Studies in Burgundian Romanesque Sculpture, London : Pindar Press, 1998, ISBN 0907132952
- The Lewis Chessmen and the Enigma of the Hoard, London : British Museum Press, 1997, ISBN 0714105872
- Westminster Kings and the Medieval Palace of Westminster, John Cherry and Neil Stratford, London : British Museum Press, 1995, ISBN 0861591151
- Catalogue of Medieval Enamels in the British Museum. Vol.2, Northern Romanesque Enamel, London : British Museum Press, 1993, ISBN 0714105600
- Romanesque and Gothic : Essays for George Zarnecki, edited by Neil Stratford, Woodbridge : Boydell, 1987, ISBN 0851154727
- Romanesque Metalwork : Copper Alloys and Their Decoration, W.A. Oddy, Susan La Niece, Neil Stratford with contributions by P.T. Craddock, M.J. Hughes, London : British Museum Press, 1986, ISBN 0714105473
