= T. G. H. James =

British Egyptologist, epigrapher and museum curator

Thomas Garnet Henry James, CBE, FBA (8 May 1923 – 16 December 2009), known as Harry James, was a British Egyptologist, epigrapher, and museum curator. He is best known for his career long association with the British Museum, serving with the Department of Ancient Egypt from 1951 to 1988, including 14 years as Keeper. He also had a large number of outside scholarly interests and wrote a large number of important research works on the subject of Ancient Egypt.

== Life ==
James was born in 1923 in Neath, Glamorganshire and attended Neath Grammar School before joining the Royal Artillery during the Second World War, reaching the rank of captain. After the end of the war he attended Exeter College, Oxford and there studied under Sir Alan Gardiner and Battiscombe Gunn, two of the most significant Egyptologists of the twentieth century. In 1951 he took a position in the Department of Egyptian and Assyrian Antiquities at the British Museum in London and there worked on a number of specialised research projects, focusing on translation of Egyptian hieroglyphs and publishing extensively on a wide variety of topics. In 1972 he worked with Eiddon Edwards on the "Treasures of Tutankhamun" exhibition at the British Museum, which remains the most popular museum exhibition ever staged in Britain. In 1974 he replaced Edwards as Keeper of Ancient Egypt and ran the department successfully until 1988, redeveloping the Egyptian Sculpture Gallery to acclaim in 1981.

Outside his museum work and individual research, James edited the Journal of Egyptian Archaeology for ten years and was active in the Egypt Exploration Society which organised British fieldwork expeditions in Egypt. In retirement he continued to perform research and publish, most notably with a biography of Howard Carter in 1992 and held a number of scholarly positions including the chairmanship of the Freud Museum. He was also made a Fellow of the British Academy and a Commander of the Order of the British Empire. He died in December 2009 and was survived by his son Stephen, his wife having died seven years earlier.
