= C. J. Gadd =

British assyriologist

C. J. Gadd CBE FBA FSA
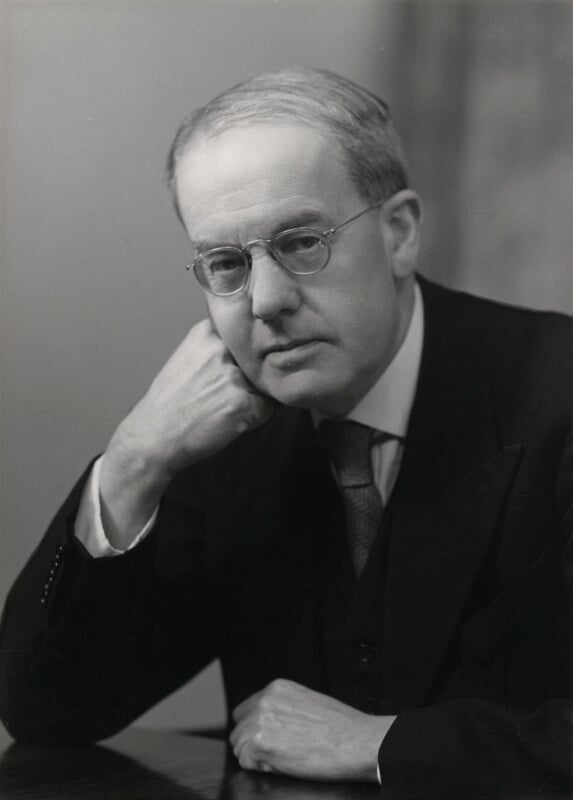
- Gadd in 1953
- Born: 2 July 1893
- Died: 2 December 1969 (aged 76)

Academic background
- Education: Brasenose College, Oxford

Academic work
- Discipline: Ancient Near Eastern studies
- Sub-discipline: Assyriology; Sumerian; Cuneiform; clay tablets; Assyrian sculpture; Near Eastern archaeology
- Institutions: British Museum; King's College, London; School of Oriental and African Studies, University of London

Cyril John Gadd, CBE, FBA, FSA (2 July 1893 – 2 December 1969) was a British Assyriologist, Sumerologist, and curator. He was Keeper of the Department of Egyptian and Assyrian Antiquities, British Museum from 1948 to 1955, and Professor of Ancient Semitic Languages and Civilizations at the School of Oriental and African Studies, University of London from 1955 to 1960.

== Biography ==
Gadd was born on 2 July 1893 in Bath, Somerset, England. Having won a scholarship, he was educated at King Edward VI School, Bath, then an all-boys school. He then won an exhibition to study lit hum (i.e. classics) at Brasenose College, Oxford, matriculating in 1912. He also sang as a baritone in Christ Church Cathedral choir. His studies were interrupted by the First World War, and he served in the British Army on the Western Front from 1915 to 1918, first in the Worcestershire Regiment and then in the Royal Engineers. He was awarded his Bachelor of Arts (BA) degree by the University of Oxford in 1917, and returned to Oxford for a further two terms of study in Sumerian under Stephen Langdon, following his demobilisation in 1919.

Gadd joined the British Museum in September 1919 as an assistant. He additionally worked on excavations at Ur, Carchemish, Alalakh and Nimrud, and published on texts from those site dating from c. 2600–539 BCE. He was also an honorary lecture in Assyriology at King's College, London from 1923. During the Second World War, he served as a fire watcher for the British Museum and its surroundings. In 1948, he was appointed keeper of the Department of Egyptian and Assyrian Antiquities, British Museum. Having risen to keeper, he left the British Museum to enter academia, as Professor of Ancient Semitic Languages and Civilizations, at the School of Oriental and African Studies, University of London. He was appointed professor emeritus on his retirement in 1961.

Gadd married Kathleen Mary Gardiner (1887–1969) in 1930. They did not have any children. He retired to Bury St Edmunds, where he died of pneumonia and motor neurone disease on 2 December 1969.

== Selected works ==
- Gadd, C. J. (1936). The Stones of Assyria: the surviving remains of Assyrian sculpture, their recovery, and their original positions. London: Chatto and Windus.
- Edwards, I. E. S; Gadd, C. J; Hammond, N. G. L; Sollberger, E, eds. (1973), The Cambridge Ancient History: Vol. 2. Part 1, History of the Middle East and the Aegean region, c. 1800-1380 B.C, Cambridge: Cambridge University Press
- Edwards, I. E. S; Gadd, C. J; Hammond, N. G. L; Sollberger, E, eds. (1975), The Cambridge Ancient History: Vol. 2. Part 2, History of the Middle East and the Aegean region, c. 1380-1000 B.C, Cambridge: Cambridge University Press, ISBN 0511466773

Cultural offices
Preceded by Sidney Smith	Keeper of the Department of Egyptian and Assyrian Antiquities; British Museum; 1948–1955	Succeeded by I. E. S. Edwards (Keeper of Egyptian Antiquities)
Preceded by Sidney Smith	Keeper of the Department of Egyptian and Assyrian Antiquities; British Museum; 1948–1955	Succeeded by Richard David Barnett (Keeper of Western Asiatic Antiquities)
