= Stephen Glanville =

English historian and egyptologist (1900-1956)

Stephen Ranulph Kingdon Glanville MBE, FBA

Edwards Professor of Egyptology at University College London
- In office 1935–1946

Sir Herbert Thompson Professor of Egyptology
- In office 1946–1956

Provost of King's College, Cambridge
- In office 1954–1956

Personal details
- Born: 26 April 1900 Westminster, London, England
- Died: 26 April 1956 (aged 56) Cambridge, England
- Resting place: Grantchester Parish Churchyard
- Parents: Stephen James Glanville (father); Nannie Elizabeth Kingdon (mother)
- Relatives: Frank Kingdon-Ward (cousin); William Kingdon Clifford (cousin)
- Education: Marlborough College
- Alma mater: Lincoln College, Oxford
- Military career
- Allegiance: United Kingdom
- Branch: Royal Air Force
- Service years: 1939-45
- Rank: Wing Commander
- Conflicts: World War II

Stephen Ranulph Kingdon Glanville, MBE, FBA (26 April 1900 – 26 April 1956) was an English historian and egyptologist. He was Edwards Professor of Egyptology at University College London from 1935 to 1946. He was then Sir Herbert Thompson Professor of Egyptology at the University of Cambridge from 1946 until his death in 1956, and additionally Provost of King's College, Cambridge from 1954.

== Biography ==
S R K Glanville was born in Westminster, London, the eldest son of Stephen James Glanville and Nannie Elizabeth (née Kingdon). He was first cousin to Frank Kingdon-Ward the explorer and botanist and also related to William Kingdon Clifford the mathematician. He was educated at Marlborough and at Lincoln College, Oxford, where he read Modern History. He gained his BA in 1922 and his MA in 1926.

He worked for the Egyptian Government Service in 1922 before joining the Egypt Exploration Society expedition to el-Amarna in 1923. Glanville studied Egyptology under Francis Llewellyn Griffith and was appointed Assistant in the Department of Egyptian and Assyrian Antiquities at the British Museum in 1924. Glanville excavated again at el-Amarna in 1925, and at Armant in 1928. In 1925 he married Ethel Mary Chubb. She was the sister of Mary Chubb, the writer about archaeology

He was Laycock Student of Egyptology at Worcester College, Oxford, between 1929-1935 and Reader in Egyptology from 1933 to 1935. Sir Flinders Petrie having retired, Glanville was appointed Edwards Professor of Egyptian Archaeology and Philology at University College London in 1935, holding the chair until 1946.

The first volume of his catalogue of demotic papyri in the British museum was published in 1939 and the last volume only a fortnight before his death. Though primarily a demotist, he was also a first class archaeologist with a rare feeling for antiquities.

Royal Institution Christmas Lectures for children in 1929-30 theme "How things were done in ancient Egypt". Elaborated into a book, Daily life in ancient Egypt.

1933 - 1935 he was a reader in Egyptology in the University of London. In 1935 elected Edwards Professor of Egyptology at University College, and a fellow of the British Academy in 1946.

During the Second World War, Glanville served with the Royal Air Force (Air Staff). He reached the rank of Wing Commander, and was awarded the M.B.E. and Czechoslovak, Dutch, and Yugoslav orders.

Returning to academic life, Glanville was a fellow, 1946–54. In 1954, he "became the first Oxford man to become provost of King's College, Cambridge, a position to which he was unanimously elected in 1954.". Moreover, he was Sir Herbert Thompson Professor of Egyptology at the University of Cambridge from 1946 until his death in Cambridge on his 56th birthday, 26 April 1956.

He was Honorary Secretary, 1928–31 and 1933–6, and Chairman of Committee, 1951–6, of the Egypt Exploration Society.

The Herbert Thompson chair of Egyptology was created in 1946 particularly to cover Demotic and Coptic studies for which SRKG had established an unequalled reputation. He was therefore the obvious choice for the first holder.

He was editor of The Legacy of Egypt, one of the Clarendon "Legacy" series, and besides his "Growth and Nature of Egyptology" which was published in 1947, wrote a large number of essays and papers.

He died in Cambridge, England, on his 56th birthday, and is buried in Grantchester Parish Churchyard.

== Relationship with the Mallowans ==
Glanville was a close friend of the archaeologist Max Mallowan and his wife Agatha Christie. He was in service with Mallowan during WWII. Glanville was the source and inspiration for at least two of Christie's works, the historic mystery Death Comes as the End, and a play, Akhnaton. Both of these works are set in ancient Egypt, and Christie herself acknowledged in her autobiography that neither of these works would have been possible without Glanville.

== Publications ==
This is by no means a complete list.

- 1930 Daily Life in Ancient Egypt
- 1933 The Egyptians, A&C Black
- 1939 Catalogue of the demotic papyri in the British Museum. Vol 1.
- 1942 The Legacy of Egypt, Oxford, Clarendon Press, Legacy series
- 1947 Growth and nature of Egyptology
- 1956 Catalogue of the demotic papyri in the British Museum. Vol 2.

Publication date unknown: Glanville S.R.K. and Faulkner, R. O., Catalogue of Egyptian Antiquities in The British Museum II: Wooden Model Boats. Trustees of The British Museum, London 1972.

== Sources ==
- Obituary in the Daily Telegraph. 28.04.1956 Prof. S.R.K. Glanville. Antiquities of Egypt
- Also see below external links.

Academic offices
Preceded by John Tresidder Sheppard	Provost of King's College, Cambridge; 1954-1956	Succeeded by Noel Annan
