= I. E. S. Edwards =

English Egyptologist and museum curator

I. E. S. Edwards CBE FBA
- Born: Iorwerth Eiddon Stephen Edwards; 21 July 1909
- Died: 24 September 1996 (aged 87)
- Citizenship: United Kingdom
- Occupation: Curator

Academic background
- Education: Merchant Taylors' School, Northwood
- Alma mater: Gonville and Caius College, Cambridge

Academic work
- Discipline: Egyptology
- Sub-discipline: Egyptian hieroglyphs; Tutankhamun; Egyptian pyramids
- Institutions: British Museum

Iorwerth Eiddon Stephen Edwards, CBE, FBA (21 July 1909 – 24 September 1996)—known as I. E. S. Edwards—was an English Egyptologist and curator, considered to be a leading expert on the pyramids.

== Biography ==
Born in London, he was the son of Edward Edwards (1870–1944) of the British Museum, and his wife Ellen Jane Higgs. He attended Merchant Taylors' School, where he studied Hebrew, and then Gonville and Caius College, Cambridge, gaining a first class in Oriental Languages. He was awarded the William Wright studentship in Arabic and received his doctorate in 1933.

In 1934, Edwards joined the British Museum as Assistant Keeper in the Department of Egyptian and Assyrian Antiquities. He published Hieroglyphic Texts for Egyptian Stelae in 1939. During World War II, he was sent to Egypt on military duty. In 1946, he wrote The Pyramids of Egypt, which was published by Penguin Books in 1947. In 1955, he was appointed the Keeper of Egyptian Antiquities at the British Museum and organized the Tutankhamun exhibition in 1972. He remained there until his retirement in 1974.

On leaving the British Museum, he worked with UNESCO during the rescue of the temple complex at Philae. He was also vice-president of the Egypt Exploration Society, a fellow of the British Academy (1962) and was appointed a CBE in 1968 for his services to the British Museum.

== Family ==
Edwards married Elizabeth Lisle in 1938. They had a daughter and a son.

== See also ==
- List of Egyptologists

Cultural offices
Preceded by C. J. Gadd	Keeper of the Department of Egyptian Antiquities, British Museum; 1955–1974	Succeeded by T. G. H. James
