= Areika =

Archaeological site

Areika was a Kushite town in Lower Nubia on the west bank of the Nile near the Amada region. It was excavated between 1907 and 1910 by David Randall-MacIver and Leonard Woolley of the University of Pennsylvania Museum. Artifacts discovered here were found to be from the C-Group culture as well as Egyptian activity from the Middle Kingdom.

== See also ==
- Karanog
