= Tell al-'Ubaid Copper Lintel =

Sumerian copper panel

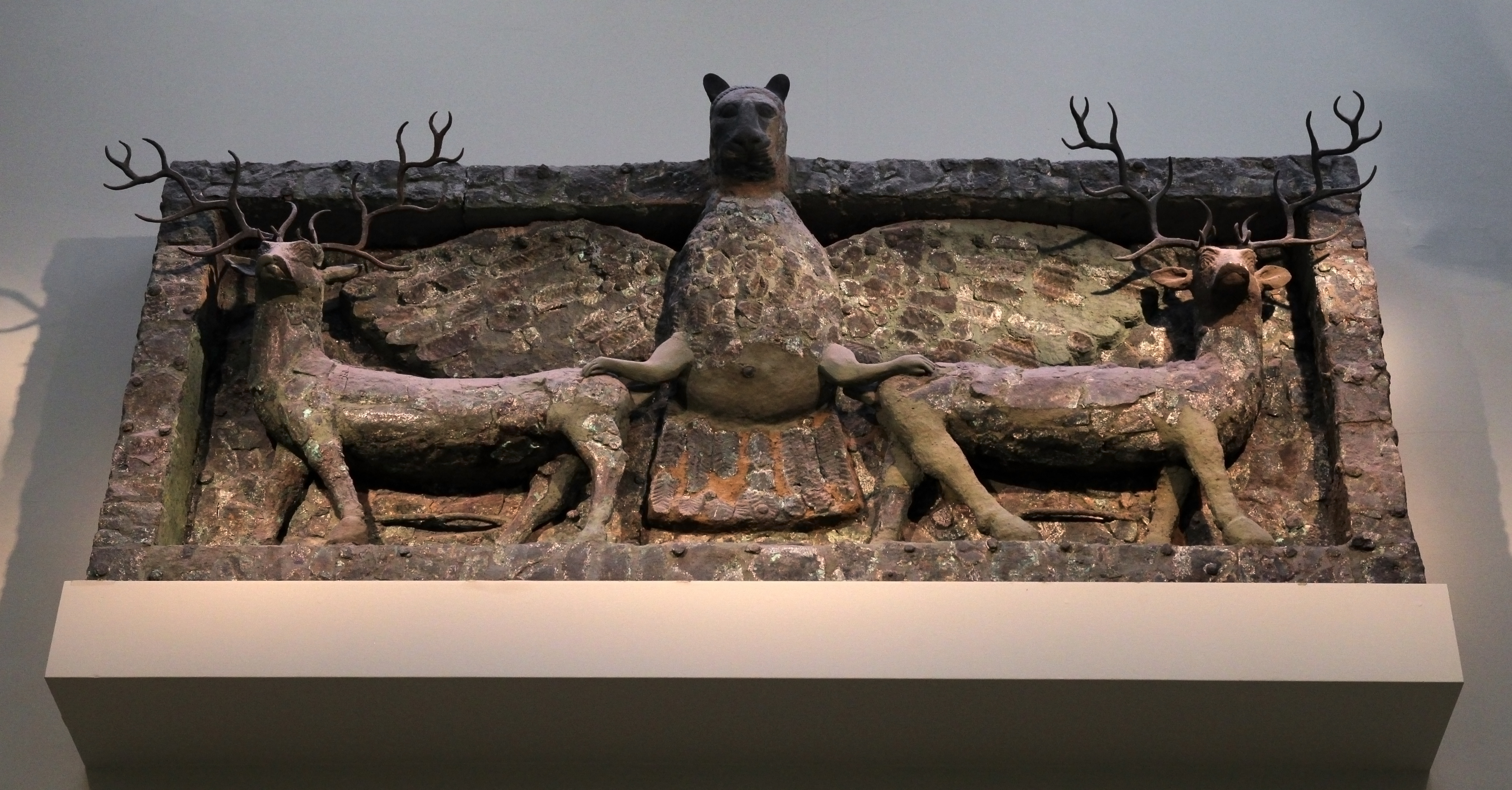
- Tell al-'Ubaid Copper Lintel on display in the British Museum
- Material: Copper
- Size: Length 2.59 metres, Height 1.07 metres
- Created: 2600–2400 BC
- Present location: British Museum, London
- Identification: ME 114308

The Tell al-'Ubaid Copper Lintel or Imdugud Relief is a large copper panel found at the ancient Sumerian city of Tell al-'Ubaid (in modern southern Iraq). Excavated by the English archaeologist Henry Hall in 1919, the frieze is one of the largest metal sculptures to survive from ancient Mesopotamia and is now preserved in the British Museum.

== Discovery ==
The sculpture was discovered in 1919 at the base of a temple foundation made from mud and brick at the isolated Sumerian site of Tell al-'Ubaid, close to the ancient city of Ur in southern Iraq. Archaeologists have determined from extant inscriptions and sculptures that the temple was dedicated to the goddess Ninhursag. Based on where it was originally found, it has been suggested that the copper panel was located above the temple door, in full view of the congregation. Soon after its discovery, the sculpture was shipped to London as part of the British Museum's share of the finds.

== Description ==
This impressive metal relief was found in a parlous state and had to be heavily restored by conservators afters its discovery. The central figure in the restored lintel shows the lion-headed eagle Imdugud who is the symbol of the god Ningirsu. Flanking either side of the god are two stags, one of whose heads has been restored. The relief was beaten out of a very large piece of copper and almost seems to stand apart from the background. For an object of this size to survive is unusual as most metal artefacts were melted down for their bullion value in antiquity.

== See also ==
- Copper Bull

== Bibliography ==
- H.R. Hall and C.L. Woolley, Ur Excavations, vol. I: Al-Uba (London, Oxford University Press, 1927)
- T. C. Mitchell, Sumerian art: illustrated by objects from Ur and Al-'Ubaid (London, The British Museum Press, 1969)
- H.W.F. Saggs, Babylonians (London, The British Museum Press, 1995)
- D. Collon, Ancient Near Eastern art (London, The British Museum Press, 1995)
- M. Roaf, Cultural atlas of Mesopotamia (New York, 1990)
