= Corbridge Lion =

Ancient Roman sandstone sculpture

Coordinates: 54.978°N 2.030°W

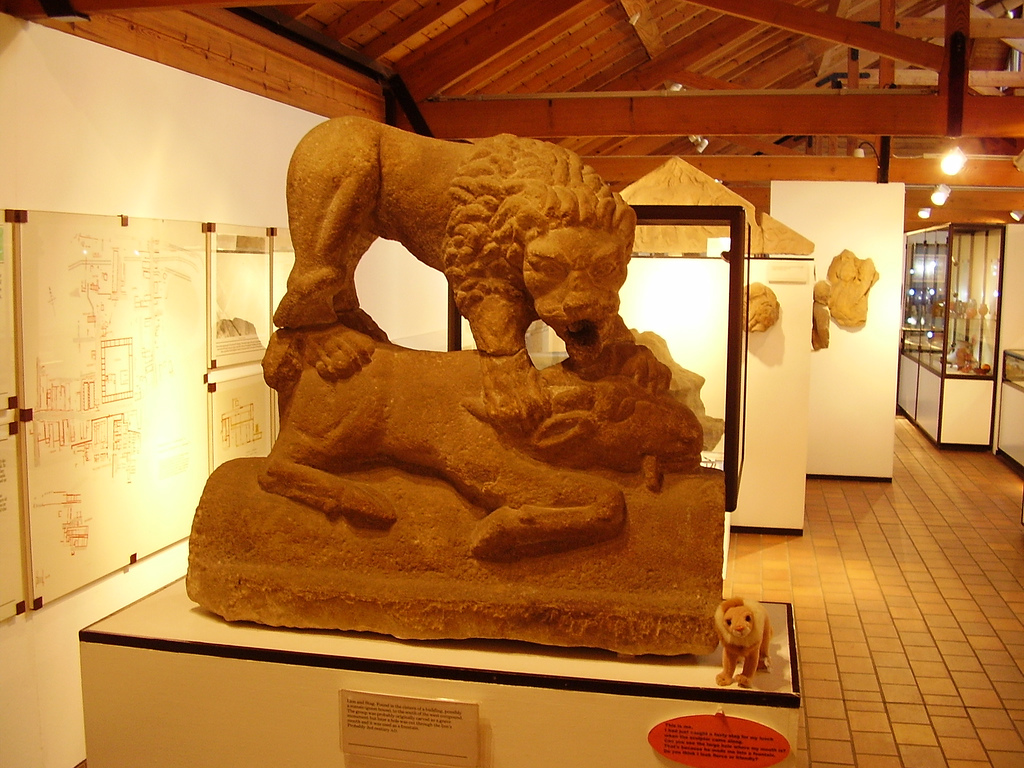
The Corbridge Lion in the Roman Corbridge Museum

The Corbridge Lion, Northumberland, England, is an ancient Roman free-standing sandstone sculpture of a male lion standing on a prone animal (possibly a deer) on a semi-cylindrical coping stone base. Measuring 0.95m in length by 0.36m in width and 0.87m high, it was originally a piece of decorative funerary ornamentation from a tomb. It was subsequently re-used as a fountainhead by passing a water pipe through its mouth. It was found in a water tank in 1907 in excavations led by Leonard Woolley on Site II (a corridor building with tesselated floors, hypocausts, and painted wallplaster that has been suggested as a mansio or posting station) on the Roman site at Corbridge. It is believed to date to the 2nd or 3rd centuries AD.

Woolley noted that it was found whilst he was at the bank in Corbridge collecting the workers' wages, and that when they revealed their discovery to him upon his return, the man who excavated it commented "when I first saw that there lion he had a blooming orange in 'is mouth!".

At least four other stone lions have been found at Corbridge: two were excavated in association with the enclosure wall around a 2nd-century mausoleum at Shorden Brae, in the cemetery just west of the Roman town, one was found built into a wall in the village, and another (now lost) was in a private museum owned by Bartholomew Lumley during the early 19th century.

The Corbridge Lion is now on display in the Corbridge Roman site museum run by English Heritage.
