= George Cathcart Woolley =

British colonial administrator

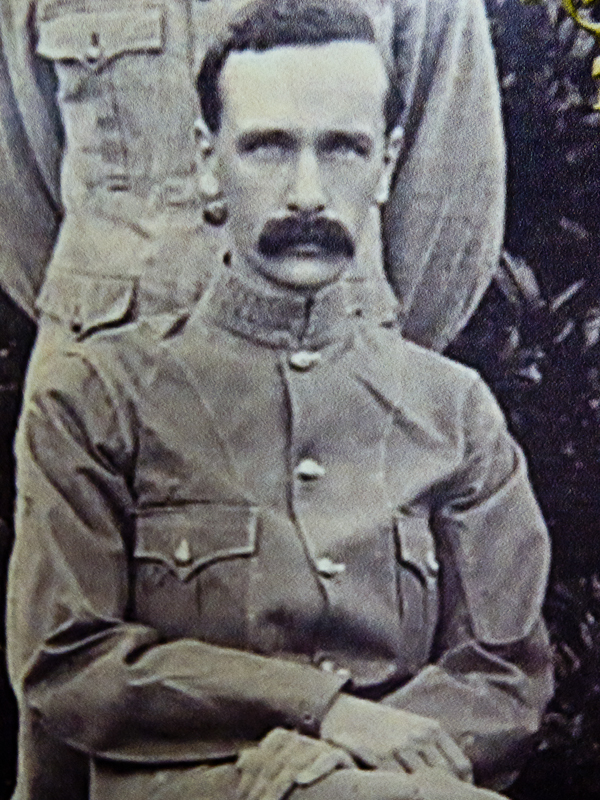
G. C. Woolley (1903)

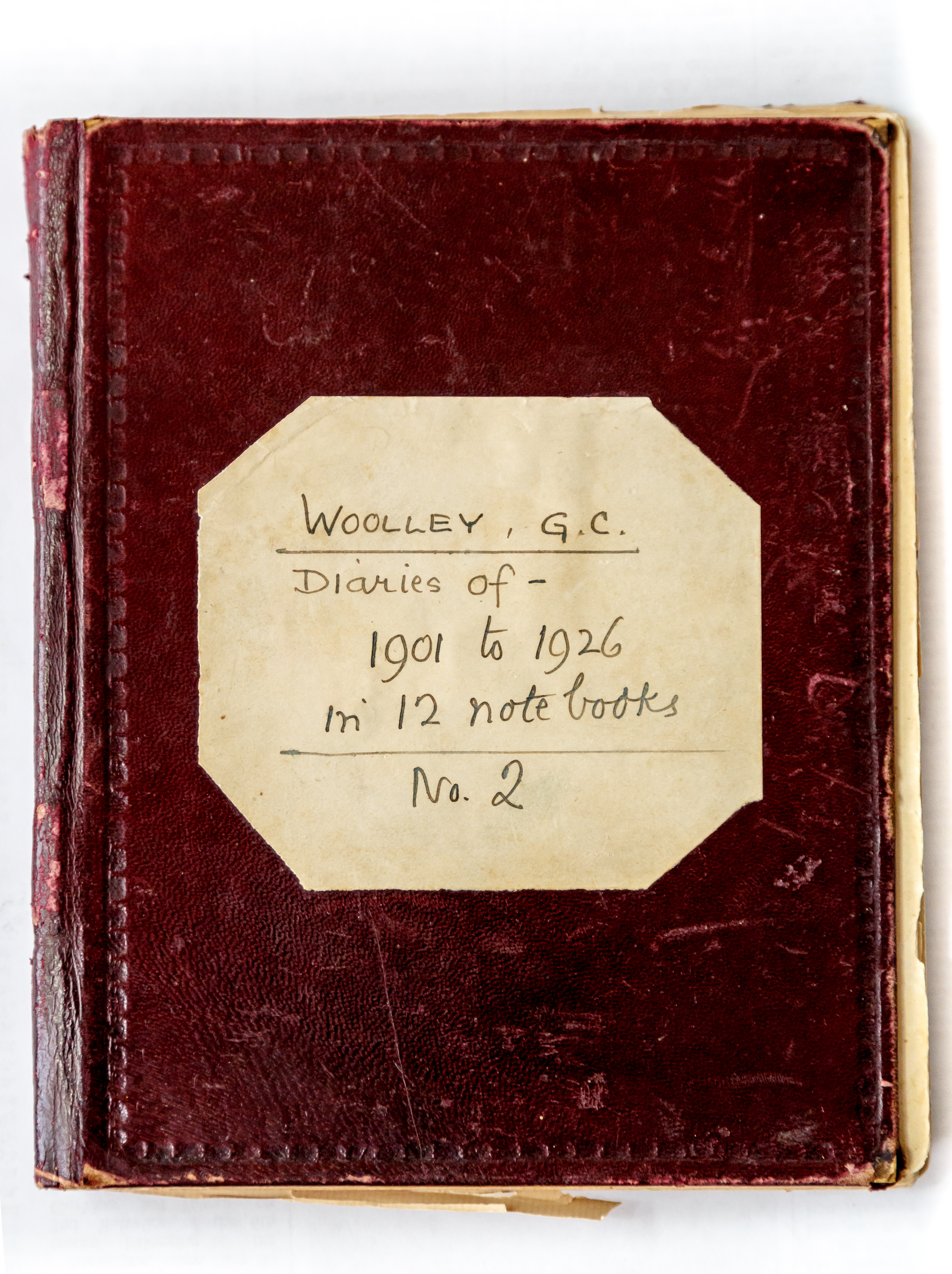
No. 2 of the series of twelve diaries, Woolley wrote between 1901 and 1926

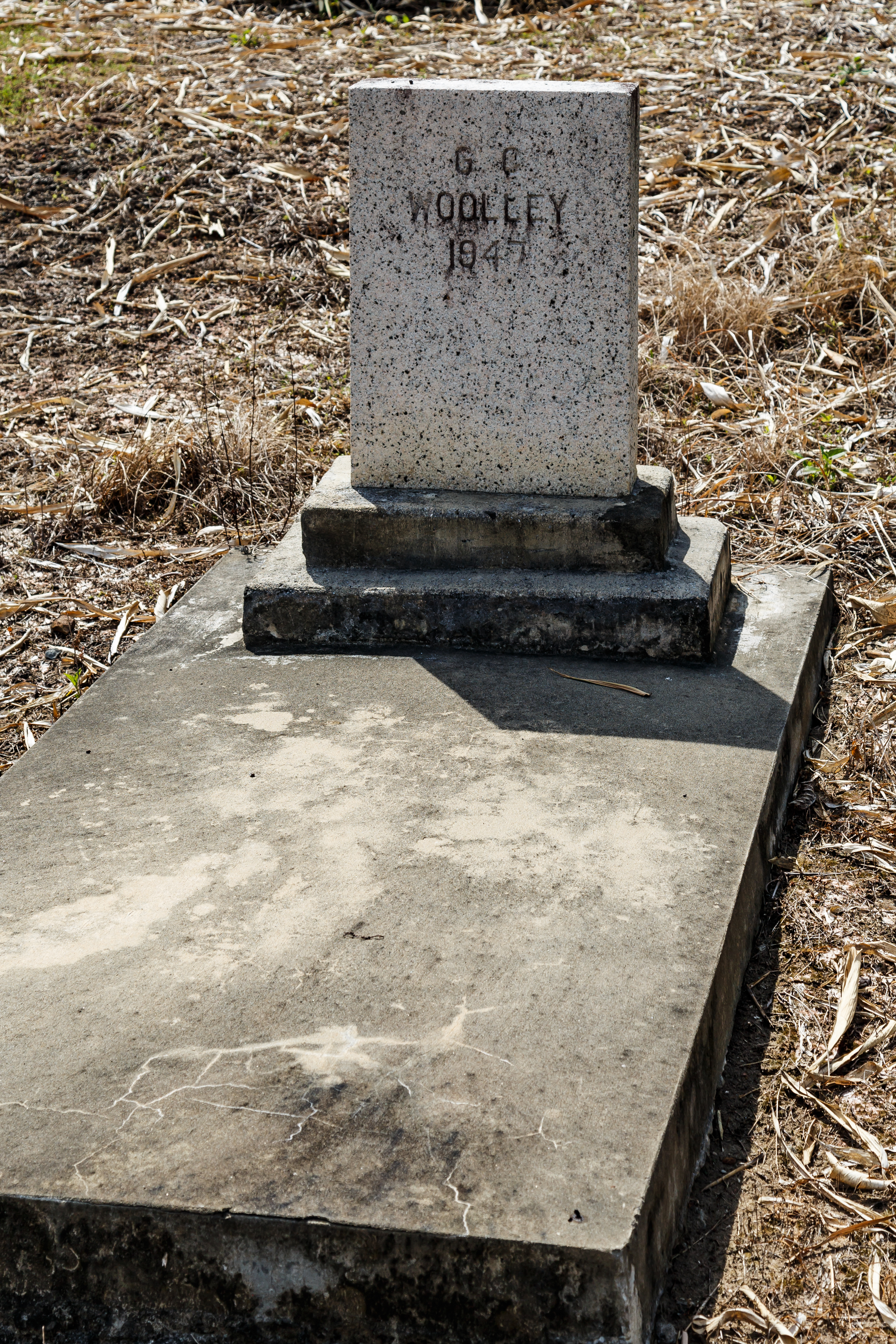
Woolley's tombstone at the old Anglican cemetery in Kota Kinabalu

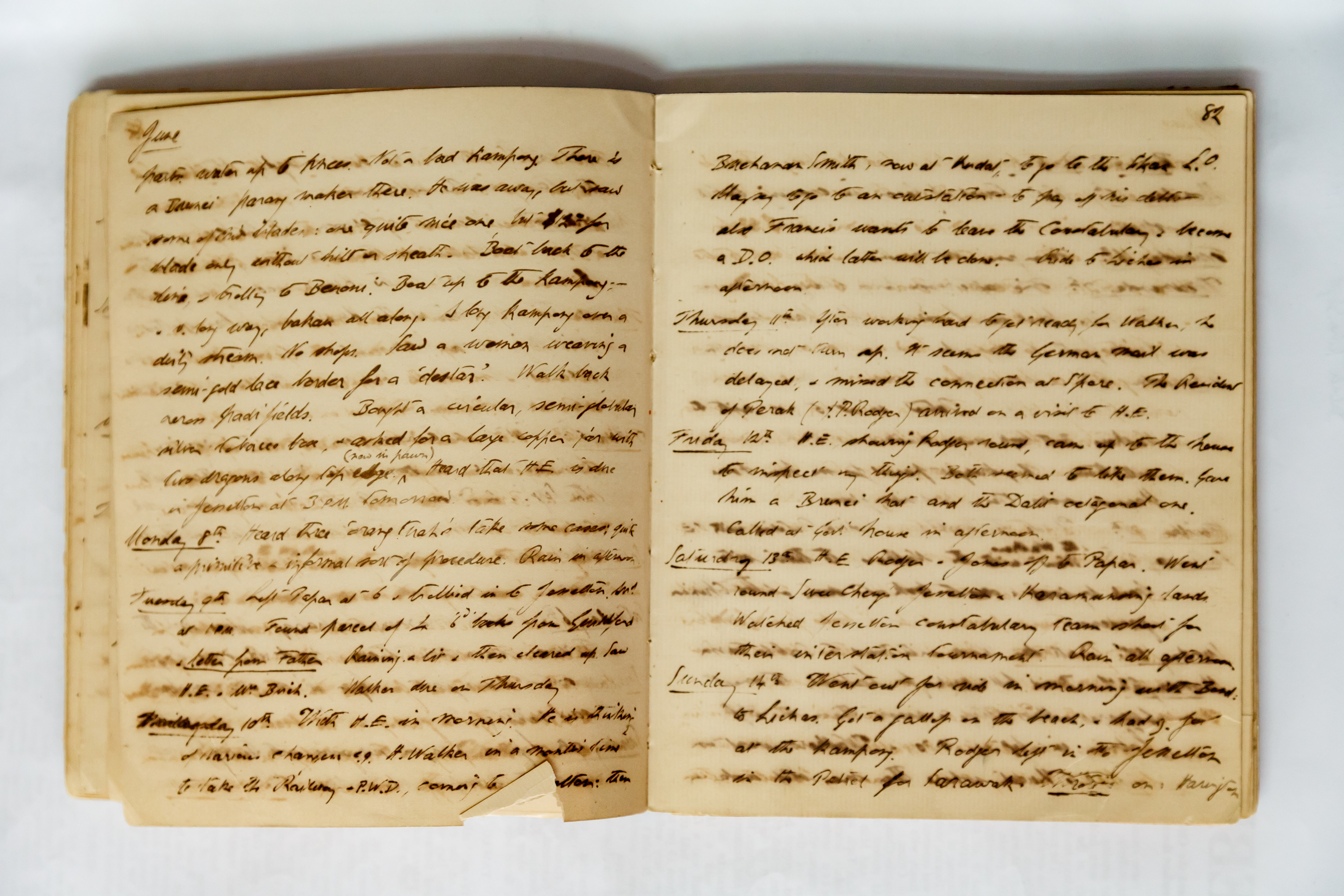
Handwriting of Woolley in diary no. 2

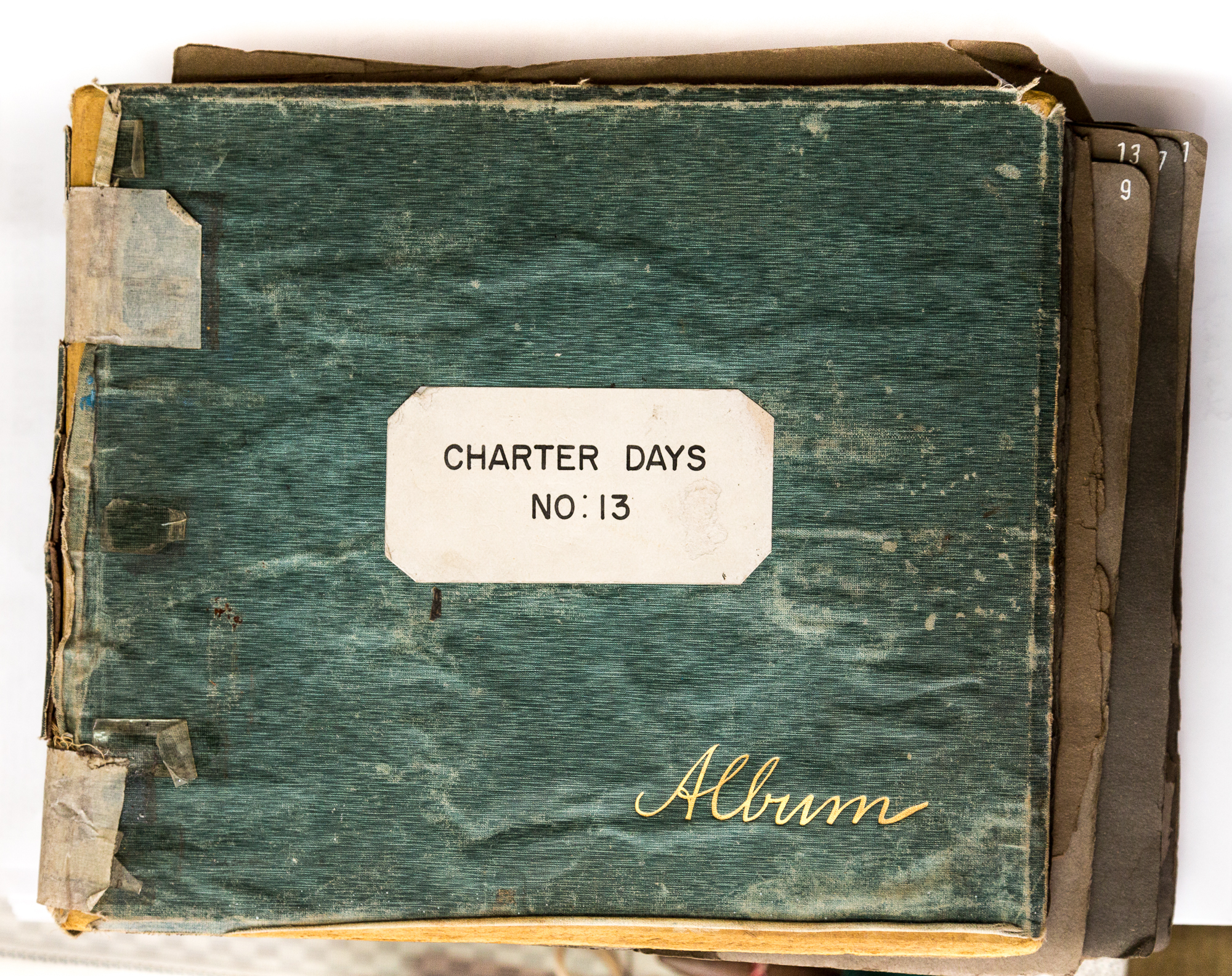
Photoalbum No. 13

George Cathcart Woolley (24 December 1876 – 6 December 1947) was a British colonial administrator in North Borneo (now Sabah) in the early part on the twentieth century. Woolley was also an ethnographer and an ardent collector, and the Woolley Collections of photographs, diaries and other artefacts, bequeathed to the State Government of Sabah, formed the nucleus of Sabah Museum when it was founded in 1965.

== Life ==
Woolley was born in Tyn-y-Celyn near Ruthin in North Wales. Woolley was the son of a clergyman, Rev. George Herbert Woolley the curate of St Matthew’s, Upper Clapton, Hackney in London, and his wife Sarah Woolley. He had seven sisters and three brothers, including the famous archaeologist Sir Leonard Woolley and Rev. Geoffrey Harold Woolley, the first Territorial Army officer to be awarded the Victoria Cross. Woolley was educated at Merchant Taylors School and Queen’s College, Oxford, graduating in 1899.

In 1901 he joined the Land Office of the North Borneo Chartered Company at Labuan, and he served in this office in various locations in North Borneo for many years. As part of his duties as Land Commissioner, he had to travel extensively in North Borneo to carry out land surveys and to solve land disputes. During these travels he developed a keen interest in the native people and their customs, especially the Muruts of the Interior. Over his lifetime he amassed a sizeable collection of artefacts, including a comprehensive collection of native weapons including Malay krises (also spelled as kerises). Woolley bequeathed some of these weapons to the Pitt Rivers Museum in Oxford, England, some of which were later acquired by Sabah Museum.

Woolley’s tenure as District Officer for Jesselton (now Kota Kinabalu), Beaufort, and later on as Resident of the Interior Division deepened his knowledge of local customs and traditions.

In the 1930s Woolley was employed by the North Borneo Government to investigate causes for indigenous depopulation, especially among Muruts and Kadazandusuns, to determine what could be done to reverse the trend.

He retired in 1932, and briefly went back to England, but decided to return to North Borneo in 1934, and it was noted that he "constantly and readily" gave his services to work in the interests of the State. He was awarded the North Borneo General Service Medal in 1940. In the pre-war period of his retirement he wrote many articles on local traditional customs, or adat. These were particularly important as they were the first time these adats had been formalised in writing and thereafter served as standard references for the tribes. In 1941 he rejoined Government service as Acting Protector of Labour and Secretary for Chinese Affairs.

From 1942 until September 1945 Woolley was interned, along with other Allied European civilians in the Japanese internment camp at Batu Lintang, in Kuching, Sarawak. Despite his age, Woolley received severe beatings and other harsh treatment, including 30 days in the guard room on a diet of rice and water. After the war, when the guards who had mis-treated him were on trial as war criminals, Woolley refused to give evidence against them, saying to do so would only perpetuate bitterness among men. He lived in England briefly after the war, but returned again to North Borneo in March 1947. He died on 6 December 1947, and was buried at the old Anglican cemetery at Jesselton, now Kota Kinabalu.

Woolley was "a confirmed bachelor, completely inured to the attentions of the girls of the 'fishing fleet', unmarried, and sent to the colonies to find husbands."

== Legacy ==
Woolley’s collection formed the basis of the Sabah Museum when it was founded in the 1960s. Along with the native artefacts, it comprised his papers and a large photographic collection. Woolley bequeathed 2,843 photographs, filling 17 albums, that he took during his service in North Borneo. There are also 1,797 glass negatives that cover the period between 1909 and 1920. The subjects of the photographs include the different tribes of North Borneo, town scenes and some European officials. Woolley's diaries cover the period from his arrival in Sabah in 1901 to 1926.

The Woolley Collections Room for materials on local history at the Sabah State Library in Kota Kinabalu was named in his honour.

An exhibition of Woolley’s photographs was held at Sabah Museum from 2–27 February 2009.

Among the items that had been bequeathed to the Sabah Museum were the diaries of G. C. Woolley. Together with reproductions of hitherto unpublished photos of his collection, the Museum started to publish an annotated version of his diaries, divided into four volumes. The first volume was published in 2015, second in 2016, while the third and fourth volume are scheduled for publication in July 2015.

== Publications ==
- 1922 Introductory note to N. B. Baboneau’s “A Murut vocabulary”. Journal of the Straits Branch of the Royal Asiatic Society (JSBRAS) 86:343–375
- 1922 "Transmigration" British North Borneo Herald (BNBH) (16 December 1922):208–209
- 1923 "Batu Laing" BNBH 41(1):6
- 1923 "Batu Punggul, Sapulut and Batu Kinadut, Pendewan." BNBH 41(2):11–12
- 1923 "Bukit Malinggai" BNBH 41(5):47–48
- 1923 "The Dusuns of British North Borneo" BNBH 41(9):83–84.
- 1923 "Fire" BNBH 41(3):25.
- 1923 "The Saluidan rapids on the Sook River" BNBH 41(4):38.
- 1923 "The story of Kohlong and his wife Puok" BNBH 41(6):56.
- 1923 "The story of Lalangau, the giant" BNBH 41(7):66–67.
- 1927 "Mentugi, a Murut ordeal" BNBH 45(19):179–180.
- 1927 "Two Murut pantuns from the Dalit District, Keningau, British North Borneo" Journal of the Malaysian Branch of the Royal Asiatic Society (JMBRAS) 5(2):366–369.
- 1928 "Murut folktales" Folklore 29:253–271, 359–381.
- 1928 "Murut songs" BNBH 46(9):78–79.
- 1929 "Some notes on Murut basket work and patterns" JMBRAS 7(2):291–315.
- 1932 "Dusun custom in Putatan District" Native Affairs Bulletin ((NAB) 7. (Reprinted in 1962.)
- 1932 "Murut basketwork" JMBRAS 10(1):23–29.
- 1936 "Some Murut hunting customs" JMBRAS 14(3):307–313.
- 1936 "The Timoguns: A Murut tribe of the interior, North Borneo" NAB 1. (Reprinted in 1962.)
- 1937 A Dusun vocabulary in the dialect of the District of Tambunan, North Borneo Jesselton: Government Printing Office.
- 1937 "Murut customs: Human sacrifice and slavery amongst the Nabai Tribe, Keningau" BNBH 55(20):236–367.
- 1937 "Tuaran adat: Some customs of the Dusuns of Tuaran, West Coast Residency, North Borneo" NAB 2. (Reprinted in 1953.)
- 1938 "Mr. F. X. Witti’s last journey and death" Bulletin of the North Borneo State Museum, No. 1. (Reprinted in Sabah Society Journal (SSJ) 5:227–262, 1971.)
- 1938 "Keris Measurements" JMBRAS
- 1938 "Origin of the Keris" JMBRAS
- 1938 "A New Book on the Keris" JMBRAS
- 1939 "Dusun Adat: Some Customs of the Dusuns of Tambunan and Ranau. West Coast Residency"
- 1939 "Kwijau adat: Customs regulating inheritance amongst the Kwijau tribe of the interior" NAB 6. (Reprinted in 1953.)
- 1939 "Murut adat: Customs regulating inheritance amongst the Nabai tribe of Keningau, and the Timogun tribe of Tenom" NAB 3. (Reprinted in 1953.)
- 1947 "A Murut fairy tale" JMBRAS 20(1):145–152.
- 1947 "The Malay Keris: Its Origin and Development" JMBRAS 20(2)
- 1947 "Notes on Two Knives in the Pitt Rivers Museum" JMBRAS 20(2)
- 1953 Adat Tuaran: Sebahagian dari adat Orang-orang Dusun di Daerah Tuaran Pantai Barat, Borneo Utara. Jesselton: Pejabat Chap Kerajaan (A reprint of Tuaran adat, written in Malay in 1936 and translated into English in 1937.)
- 1953 "Dusun adat: Customs regulating inheritance amongst the Dusun tribes in the coastal plains of Putatan and Papar" NAB 4.
- 1953 "Dusun adat: Some customs of the Dusuns of Tambunan and Ranau, West Coast Residency, North Borneo" NAB 5.
- 1962 Adat bagi mengatorkan hak waris di-antara suku Kwijau di-Pendalaman. Buku berkenaan dengan hal ahwal Anak Negeri, bilangan 6 Jesselton: Government Printing Office.Written in Malay. For the English version see Woolley, G. C., 1939 (reprinted 1953), "Kwijau adat: Customs regulating inheritance amongst the Kwijau tribe of the interior".
- 1962 Adat Dusun di-Tambunan dan Ranau. Buku berkenaan dengan hal ahwal Anak Negeri, bilangan 5 Jesselton: Government Printing Office. Written in Malay.
- 1962 Murut adat: Customs regulating inheritance amongst the Nabai tribe of Keningau, and the Timugon tribe of Tenom. Buku berkenaan dengan hal ahwal Anak Negeri Jesselton: Government Printing Office. Written in Malay.
- 1962 "The Timoguns: A Murut tribe of the interior, North Borneo" NAB 1. (First printed in 1935.)
- 2004 The Timogun Muruts of Sabah Kota Kinabalu Natural History Publications (Borneo)
- 2007 Tuaran Adat: Some Customs of the Dusuns of Tuaran, West Coast Residency, North Borneo Kota Kinabalu Natural History Publications (Borneo)

== Literature ==
- Danny Wong Tze Ken: Woolley and the Codification of native customs in Sabah in: New Zealand Journal of Asian Studies 11, 1 (June 2009): 87-105.
- Ken, Danny Wong Tze & Moo Tan, Stella: The Diaries of G.C. Woolley, Volume One: 1901-1907. Sabah State Museum, 2015. ISBN 978-983-9638-31-8
- Ken, Danny Wong Tze & Moo Tan, Stella: The Diaries of G.C. Woolley, Volume Two: 1907-1913. Sabah State Museum, 2016. ISBN 978-983-9638-32-5
