= Karanog =

Archaeological site

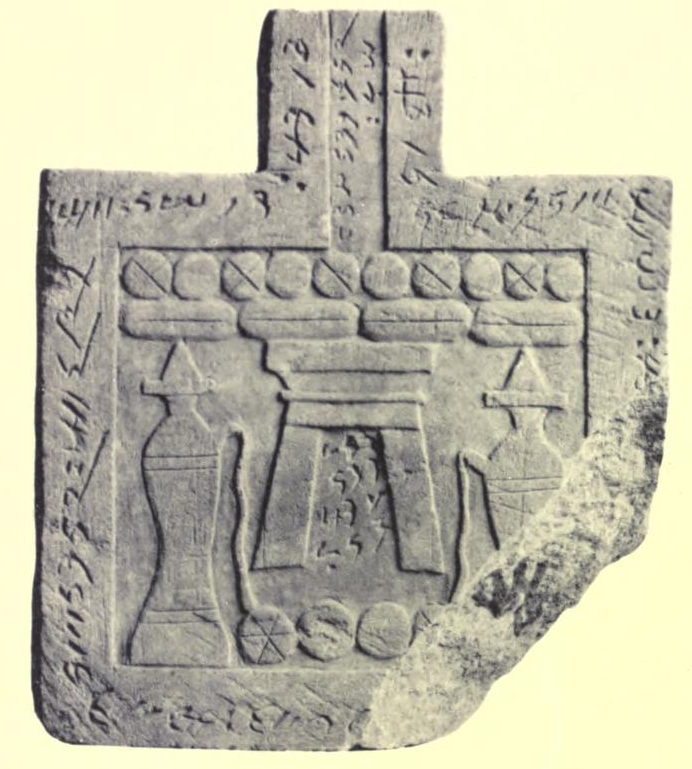
Sandstone altar from Karanog, with a Meroitic inscription around the outside.

Karanog (Meroitic: Nalote) was a Kushite town in Lower Nubia on the west bank of the Nile (near Qasr Ibrim). It was probably a provincial capital under its own peshto (governor) in the second and third centuries AD. It was excavated between 1907 and 1910 by David Randall-MacIver and Leonard Woolley of the University of Pennsylvania Museum.

Karanog was occupied throughout the Meroitic period from the third century BC. By the second century AD, it was of strategic significance on Kush's northern frontier with Rome, facing Egyptian Maharraqa. The original provincial capital had been at Faras, but it was transferred downstream as the Roman presence in the south of Egypt, the Dodecaschoenus, weakened. The town was at least partially walled. The houses of the rich and powerful, as well as the castle–palace complexes of the peshtos, have been excavated. The latter reached a size of 600 square metres (6,500 sq ft). The homes of commoners, being of mud brick construction, have not been preserved.

The cemetery at Karanog also served the nearby towns of Akin and Shimale. The distribution of grave goods shows a high level of social stratification, although the cemetery was extensively plundered over the years. Some of the less plundered graves contain luxury items, including jewellery; bronze utensils, bowls and lamps; glass beads; iron arrowheads; cotton and linen textiles; carpentry tools; ebony- and ivory-inlaid wooden objects; painted ceramics and even faience.

Karanog also contained no less than 100 objects—offering altars to Hotep and stelae—bearing inscriptions in Meroitic cursive. One stela containing both Meroitic and Egyptian demotic may be the only case of the latter found south of Egypt.

Karanog remained occupied even after the fall of Kush, when it came under the so-called X-Group culture. With the arrival of the Nubians, it disappears from the archaeological record. Today, its remains lie under Lake Nasser.

== See also ==
- Areika
