= Geoffrey Woolley =

The Reverend Geoffrey Harold Woolley VC OBE MC
- Born: Geoffrey Harold Woolley; 14 May 1892; Bethnal Green, London, England
- Died: 10 December 1968 (aged 76); West Chiltington, West Sussex, England
- Burial place: St Mary's Church, West Chiltington; 50.954425°N 0.449911°W
- Relatives: Sir Leonard Woolley (brother); George Cathcart Woolley (brother)
- Military career
- Allegiance: United Kingdom
- Branch: British Army
- Service years: 1914–1920, 1940–1944
- Rank: Major
- Units: London Regiment; Royal Army Chaplains' Department
- Conflicts: First World War; Second World War
- Awards: Victoria Cross; Order of the British Empire; Military Cross

Geoffrey Harold Woolley, VC, OBE, MC (14 May 1892 – 10 December 1968) was a British Army infantry officer, Church of England priest, and Second World War military chaplain. He was the first British Territorial Army officer to be awarded the Victoria Cross, the highest and most prestigious award for gallantry in the face of the enemy that can be awarded to British and Commonwealth forces.

== Early life and education ==
Woolley was the son of a clergyman, Rev. George Herbert Woolley, the curate of St Matthew’s, Upper Clapton, in London, and his wife Sarah. He had seven sisters and three brothers, including the famous archaeologist Sir Leonard Woolley and George Cathcart Woolley, a colonial administrator and ethnographer. Woolley was educated at Parmiter's School, Bethnal Green, St John's School, Leatherhead and The Queen's College, Oxford. He seemed destined to follow his father into the Church until the outbreak of the First World War, when he obtained a commission in the Queen Victoria's Rifles, the 9th (County of London) Battalion of the London Regiment of the British Army.

== First World War ==
The Queen Victoria's Rifles were posted to the Ypres Salient. On 17 April 1915, the British Army captured Hill 60, a low rise to the south-east of Ypres. In the midst of fierce German efforts to retake the hill, Second Lieutenant Woolley's company were sent up on the afternoon of 20 April to take ammunition supplies to the defenders. The situation quickly deteriorated, with many men and all the other officers on the hill being killed. Woolley refused verbal and written orders to withdraw, saying he and his company would remain until properly relieved. They repelled numerous attacks through the night. When they were relieved the next morning, he returned with 14 men remaining from the 150-strong company. The citation for the Victoria Cross he was awarded for this action reads:

For most conspicuous bravery on "Hill 60" during the night of 20th–21st April, 1915. Although the only Officer on the hill at the time, and with very few men, he successfully resisted all attacks on his trench, and continued throwing bombs and encouraging his men till relieved. His trench during all this time was being heavily shelled and bombed and was subjected to heavy machine gun fire by the enemy.

Two days later Woolley was promoted directly to the rank of Captain. He saw further action in the early stages of the Second Battle of Ypres until he was invalided back to England suffering from poison gas and psychological effects. When Woolley had recovered, he was appointed as an instructor at the Officers Infantry School. He returned to the Western Front in summer 1916 as a General Staff Officer Grade II on the Third Army Staff. In April 1918 he was seconded as a general staff officer, grade 3.

After the war, Woolley was one of many officers awarded the Military Cross in the King's Birthday Honours of 1919.

== Later life ==
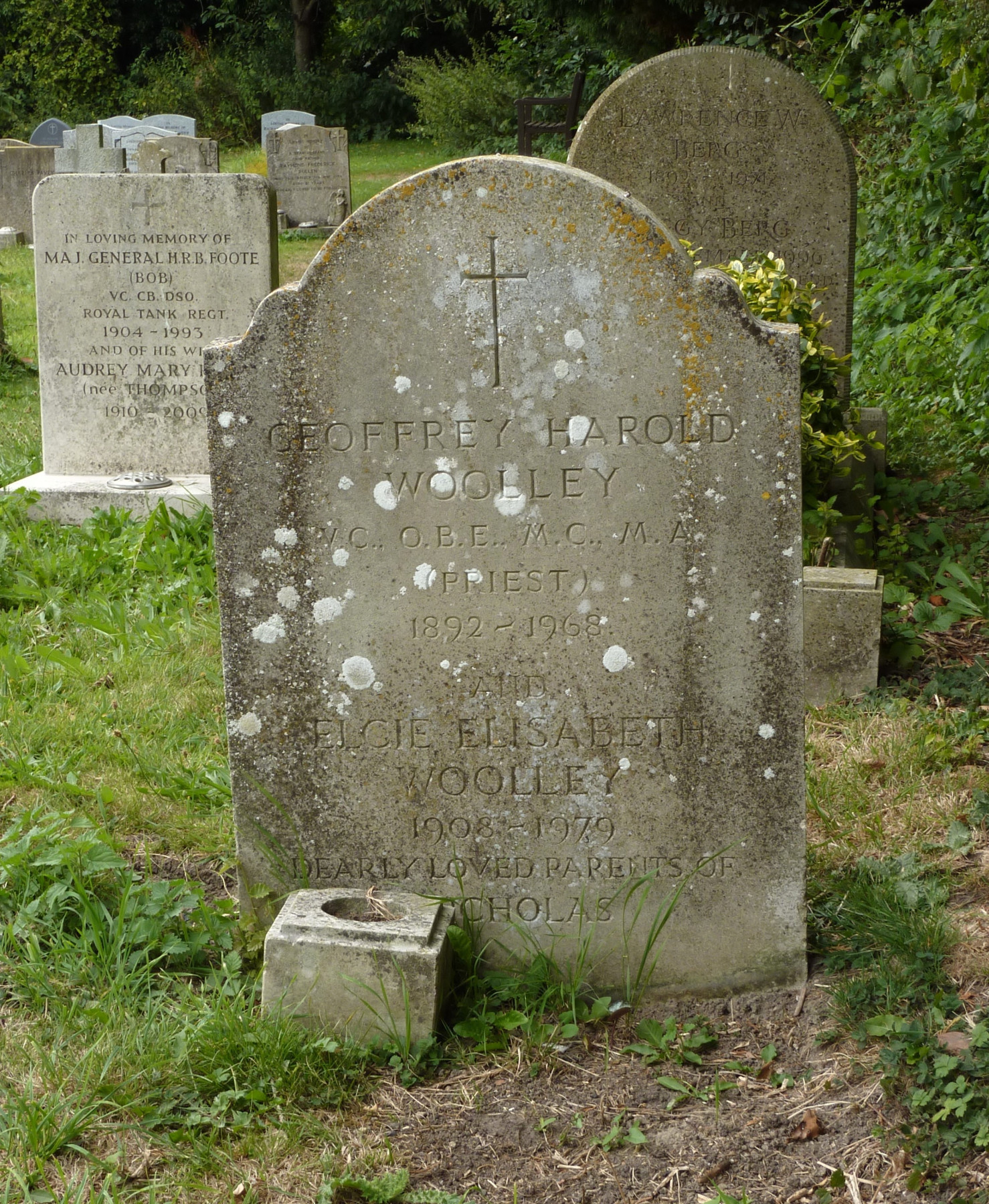
Geoffrey Woolley's grave at St Mary's Church, West Chiltington, Sussex

After the war Woolley resumed the study of theology at Oxford, was ordained in December 1920, and took a teaching post at Rugby School. In 1923 he resigned his commission and became vicar of Monk Sherborne, Hampshire, before moving on to the chaplaincy of Harrow School.

In January 1940 Woolley resigned from the school and was commissioned into the Royal Army Chaplains' Department. He was appointed Senior Chaplain of the Algiers area in November 1942, reaching the rank of Chaplain to the Forces 3rd Class (Major). With several other officers he was appointed OBE in 1943 "in recognition of gallant and distinguished services in North Africa." His son Harold, a Spitfire pilot, was posted to North Africa in the same month, and killed in early December 1942 in a battle over Tunis.

Woolley took on the parish of St Mary's, Harrow on the Hill, in 1944. In 1952, finding it difficult to climb the hill, he resigned his commission and moved to be rector of West Grinstead, Sussex, where he stayed until he retired in 1958.

== Publications ==
- The Epic of the Mountains (verse), Blackwell, Oxford, 1929
- Fear and Religion, Ernest Benn, London, 1930
- A Journey to Palestine (verse), Blackwell, Oxford, 1935
- A pocket-book of prayers for those on active service and for those at home, SCM Press, London, 1940
- Sometimes a Soldier (autobiography), Ernest Benn, London, 1963
