= Leonard Woolley =

British archaeologist (1880–1960)

Sir Leonard Woolley
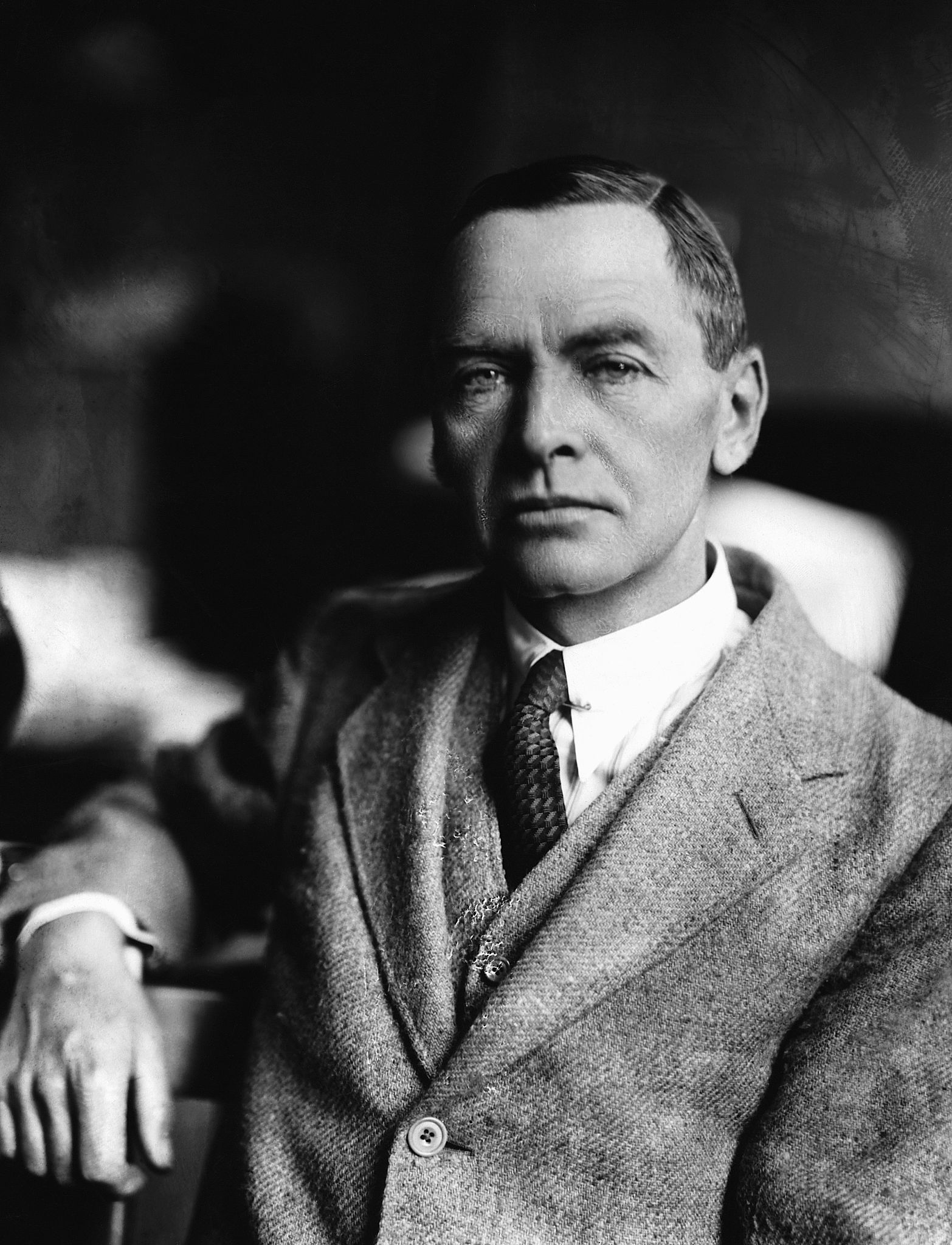
- Woolley in 1915
- Born: Charles Leonard Woolley; 17 April 1880; Clapton, London, England
- Died: 20 February 1960 (aged 79); London, England
- Education: New College, Oxford
- Known for: excavations at Ur in Mesopotamia
- Spouse: Katharine Woolley (m. 1927; died 1945)
- Scientific career
- Fields: Archaeology; military intelligence

Sir Charles Leonard Woolley (17 April 1880 – 20 February 1960) was a British archaeologist best known for his excavations at Ur in Mesopotamia. He is recognized as one of the first modern archaeologists who excavated in a methodical way, keeping careful records, and using them to reconstruct ancient life and history. Woolley was knighted in 1935 for his contributions to the discipline of archaeology. He was married to the British archaeologist Katharine Woolley.

== Early life ==
Woolley was the son of a clergyman, Rev. George Herbert Woolley, the curate of St Matthew’s, Upper Clapton, in London, and his wife Sarah. Geoffrey Harold Woolley, VC, and George Cathcart Woolley were his brothers. He was born at 13 Southwold Road, Upper Clapton, in the modern London Borough of Hackney and educated at St John's School, Leatherhead and New College, Oxford. He was interested in excavations from a young age.

== Career ==
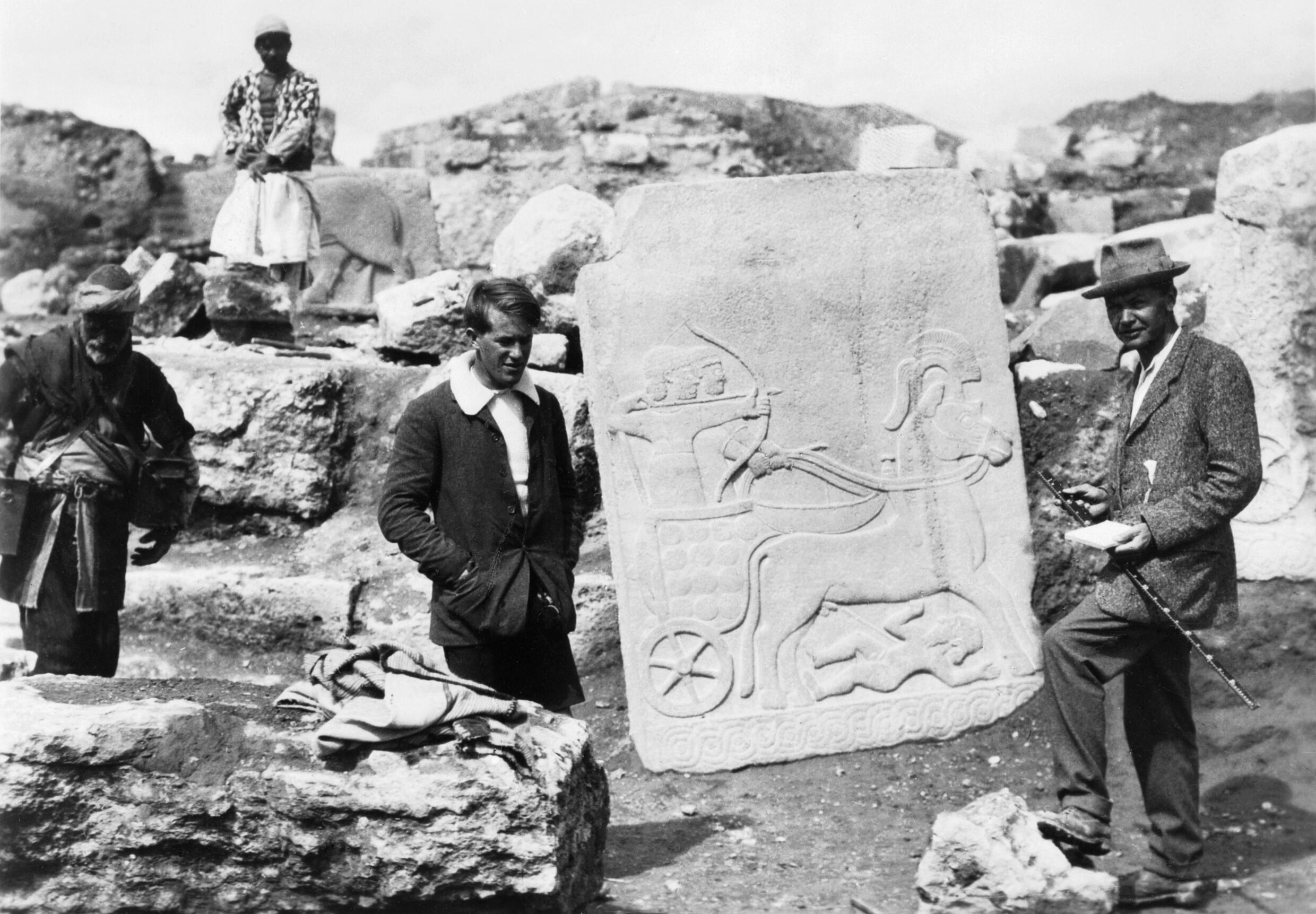
Woolley (right) and T. E. Lawrence with a Hittite slab at Carchemish during excavation, between 1912 and 1914.

In 1905, Woolley became assistant of the Ashmolean Museum, Oxford. Volunteered by Arthur Evans to run the excavations on the Roman site at Corbridge (near Hadrian's Wall) for Francis Haverfield, Woolley began his excavation career there in 1906, later admitting in Spadework that "I had never studied archaeological methods even from books ... and I had not any idea how to make a survey or a ground-plan" (Woolley 1953:15). Nevertheless, the Corbridge Lion was found under his supervision.

Woolley next travelled to Nubia in southern Egypt, where he worked with David Randall-MacIver on the Eckley Coxe Expedition to Nubia conducted under the auspices of the University of Pennsylvania Museum. Between 1907 and 1911 they conducted archaeological excavations and survey at sites including Areika, Buhen, and the Meroitic town of Karanog. In 1912–1914, with T. E. Lawrence as his assistant, he excavated the Hittite city of Carchemish in Syria. Lawrence and Woolley were apparently working for British Naval Intelligence and monitoring the construction of Germany's Berlin-to-Baghdad railway.

During World War I, Woolley, with Lawrence, was posted to Cairo, where he met Gertrude Bell. He then moved to Alexandria, where he was assigned to work on naval espionage supporting agents in the Levant and controlling some British and French ships. One of these, the requisitioned British steam yacht Zaida, sank off Alexandretta on 17 August 1916 after striking a French-laid mine. The survivors were rescued and he was held by Turkey for two years as a prisoner of war. He received the Croix de Guerre from France at the war's end.

In the following years, Woolley returned to Carchemish, and then worked at Amarna in Egypt.

=== Excavation at Ur ===
Woolley led a joint expedition of the British Museum and the University of Pennsylvania to Ur, beginning in 1922, which included his wife, the British archaeologist Katharine Woolley. There, they made important discoveries, including the Copper Bull and, in the course of excavating the royal cemetery, the Bull-Headed Lyre and the pair of Ram in a Thicket figurines. Agatha Christie's novel, Murder in Mesopotamia, was inspired by the discovery of the royal tombs. Agatha Christie later married Woolley's young assistant, Max Mallowan.

At Ur, the Woolleys discovered tombs of great material wealth, containing large paintings of ancient Sumerian culture at its zenith, along with gold and silver jewellery, cups and other furnishings. The most extravagant tomb was that of Queen Pu-Abi. Amazingly enough, Pu-Abi's tomb was untouched by looters. Inside the tomb, many well-preserved items were found, including a cylindrical seal bearing her name in Sumerian. Her body was found buried along with those of two attendants, who had been killed to continue to serve her after death. Woolley was able to reconstruct Pu-Abi's funeral ceremony from objects found in her tomb.

=== Excavation at Al Mina and Tell Atchana ===
In 1936, after the discoveries at Ur, Woolley was interested in finding ties between the ancient Aegean and Mesopotamian civilisations. This led him to the Syrian city of Al Mina. He excavated Tell Atchana in the years 1937–1939 and 1946–1949. His team discovered palaces, temples, private houses and fortification walls, in 17 archaeological levels, reaching from late Early Bronze Age (c. 2200–2000 BC) to Late Bronze Age (c. 13th century BC). Among their finds was the inscribed statue of Idrimi, a king of Alalakh c. early 15th century BC.

=== Local Genesis flood theory ===
Woolley was one of the first archaeologists to propose that the flood described in the Book of Genesis was local after identifying a flood-stratum at Ur "400 miles long and 100 miles wide; but for the occupants of the valley that was the whole world".

=== World War II ===
His archaeological career was interrupted by the United Kingdom's entry into World War II, and he became part of the Monuments, Fine Arts and Archives Section of the Allied armies. After the war, he returned to Alalakh, where he continued to work from 1946 until 1949.

== Personal life ==
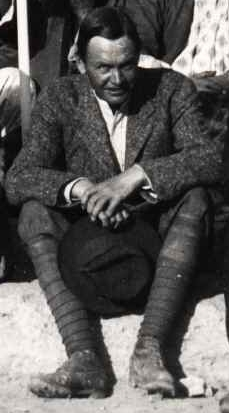
Woolley in Syria, 1912

Woolley married Katharine Elizabeth Keeling (née Menke; born June 1888 – died 8 November 1945), who was born in England to German parents and had previously been married to Lieut. Col. Bertram Francis Eardley Keeling (OBE, MC). He had hired Keeling in 1924 as expedition artist and draughtswoman; they married in 1927 and she continued to play an important role at his archaeological sites.

In 1930, Woolley invited his friend Agatha Christie to visit a dig site in Iraq, where she met her second husband Max Mallowan.

Woolley died at 16 Fitzroy Square, London on 20 February 1960 at age 79. He was cremated at Golders Green on the 24th. Dame Katharine died on 8 November 1945. They had no children.

== Publications ==
- Dead Towns and Living Men. Being Pages From An Antiquary's Notebook, Jonathan Cape, 1920
- The Sumerians, Oxford University Press, Oxford, 1928
- Ur of the Chaldees, Ernest Benn Limited, 1938 [1929] republished by Penguin Books, revised 1950, 1952
- The Excavations at Ur and the Hebrew Records, George Allen and Unwin, London, 1929
- Digging Up The Past, 1930, based on talks originally broadcast by the BBC
- Abraham: Recent Discoveries and Hebrew Origins, Faber and Faber London, 1936
- Ur: The first phases, Penguin Books Harmondsworth, 1946
- Syria as a Link Between East and West, 1936
- A Forgotten Kingdom, Penguin Books, 1953
- Spadework: Adventures in Archaeology, 1953
- Excavations at Ur: A Record of 12 Years' Work, 1954
- Alalakh, An Account of the Excavations at Tell Atchana 1937–1949, Oxford University Press, 1955
- History of Mankind, 1963 (with Jaquetta Hawkes)
- The Sumerians, 1965
