= David Randall-MacIver =

American Egyptologist

- Born: 31 October 1873
- Died: 30 April 1945 (aged 71)
- Known for: excavations at Great Zimbabwe
- Scientific career
- Fields: archaeology

David Randall-MacIver FBA (31 October 1873 – 30 April 1945) was a British-born archaeologist, who later became an American citizen. He is most famous for his excavations at Great Zimbabwe which provided the first solid evidence that the site was built by Shona peoples.

== Work in Egypt at Abydos ==
Randall-MacIver was educated at The Queens College, Oxford. He graduated in 1896 with a first class degree. He began his professional archaeological career in 1898 working for Flinders Petrie in Egypt, uncovering the mortuary temple of Senwosret III at Abydos. In 1906 he was appointed as Curator of the Egyptian Section at the Penn Museum, University of Pennsylvania, taking charge of the collection following Sara Yorke Stevenson's resignation in 1905.

In 1901, Nature Magazine were disconcerted, as the Egyptologist Randall-Maciver had suggested: "it is well worth considering whether the pre-dynastic race of Egypt is not in the main a blending in various proportions of Semite and Negro."

== Work in Nubia, in Great Zimbabwe, and in Karanog ==
With funding from Eckley B. Coxe Jr., Randall-MacIver initiated research into the relationship between Egypt and Nubia, uncovering some of the earliest evidence of ancient Nubian culture, dating back to 3100 BCE. Between 1905 and 1906 Randall-MacIver conducted the first detailed study of Great Zimbabwe. The absence of any artefacts of non-African origin led him to conclude that the structure was built by local people. Earlier scholars had speculated that the structure had been built by Arab or Phoenician traders. Between 1907 and 1910 he excavated the site of Karanog, a former provincial capital of the Kingdom of Kush.

== Activities in World War I and World War II ==
Randall-MacIver left the Penn Museum in 1911 following a disagreement with new Museum Director George Byron Gordon, becoming librarian of the American Geographical Society. In 1914 he left the AGS to work as a British intelligence officer in the First World War. In 1921 he moved to Italy to study Etruscan archaeology. He remained in Italy during World War II, assisting the Allied forces Monuments, Fine Arts, and Archives program, the famous "Monuments Men", to preserve historical monuments and cultural property.

== Death and memorial ==
Randall-MacIver died in New York City on 30 April 1945.

He is memorialised in the Parte Antica of the Protestant Cemetery, Rome.

== Books ==
- Randall-MacIver, David; Wilkin, Anthony (1901). Libyan Notes, London: Macmillan & Co.
- Randall-MacIver, David (1902). El Amrah and Abydos 1899-1901, London: The Egypt Exploration Fund.
- Thomson, Arthur; Randall-MacIver, David (1905). The Ancient Races of the Thebaid. Clarendon Press.
- Randall-MacIver, David (1906). Mediaeval Rhodesia, London: Macmillan & Co.
- Randall-MacIver, David; Woolley, C. Leonard (1909). Areika. University of Pennsylvania: Publications of the Egyptian Dept. Of the University Museum. Eckley B. Coxe junior Expedition to Nubia; 1. Printed by Horace Hart, at the University Press; with a chapter on Meroitic inscriptions by Francis Llewellyn Griffith
- Randall-MacIver, David; Woolley, C. Leonard (1911). Buhen. University of Pennsylvania: Publications of the Egyptian Dept. Of the University Museum. Eckley B. Coxe junior Expedition to Nubia; 7. The University Museum, Philadelphia.
- Randall-MacIver, David (1927). The Etruscans, Oxford at the Clarendon Press.
- Randall-MacIver, David (1928). Italy Before the Romans, Oxford at the Clarendon Press.
- Randall-MacIver, David (1931). Greek Cities in Italy and Sicily, Oxford at the Clarendon Press.
