= British Museum Department of the Middle East =

Part of the British Museum collections

Coordinates: 51.51915°N 0.12814°W

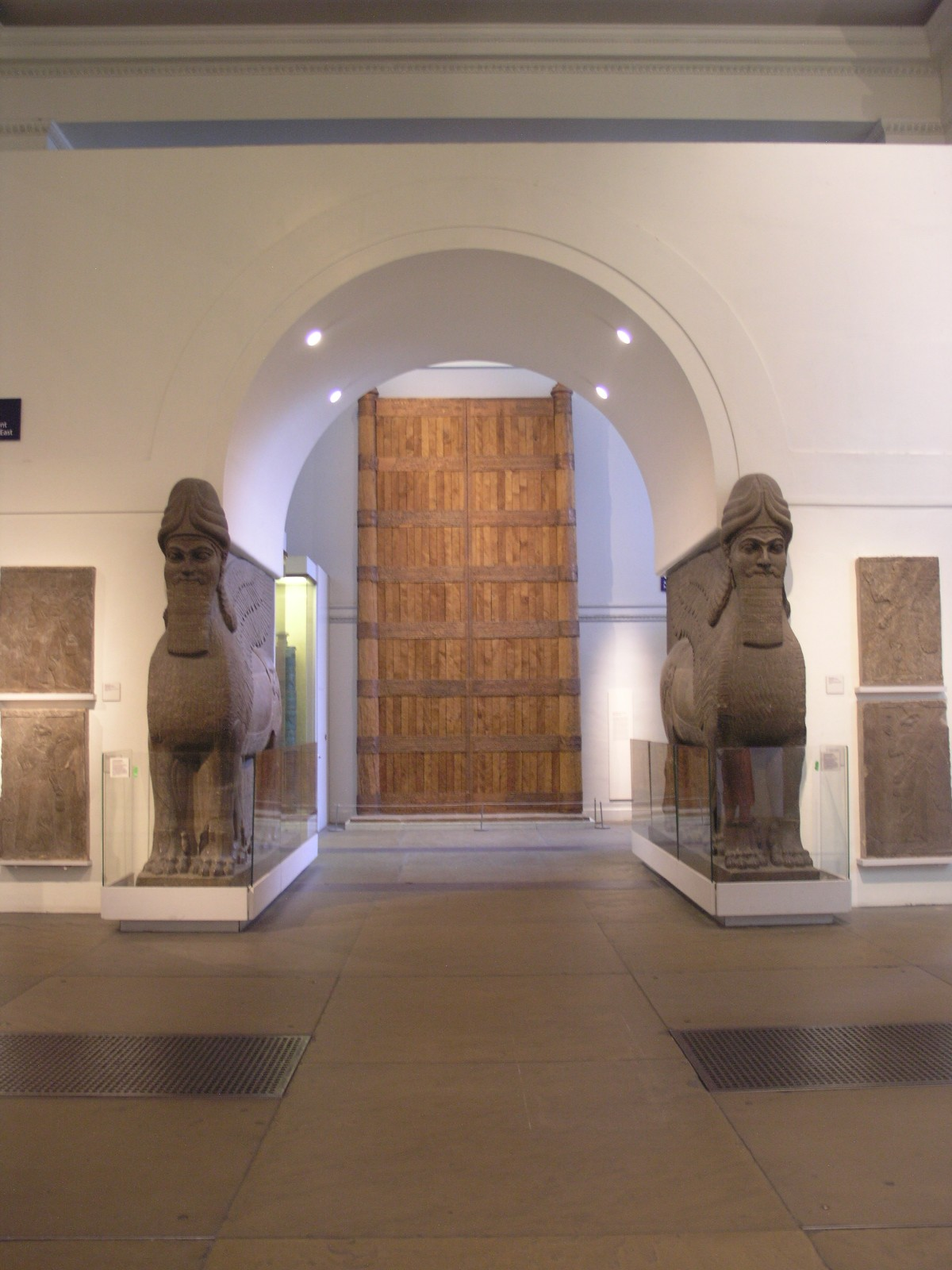
Room 6 – Pair of Human Headed Winged Lions and reliefs from Nimrud with the Balawat Gates, c. 860 BC

The Department of the Middle East (formerly Department of Western Asiatic Antiquities, then Department of Ancient Near East), numbering some 330,000 works, forms a significant part of the collections of the British Museum, and the world's largest collection of Mesopotamian antiquities outside Iraq. The collections represent the civilisations of the ancient Near East and its adjacent areas.

These cover Mesopotamia, Persia, the Arabian Peninsula, Anatolia, the Caucasus, parts of Central Asia, Syria, the Holy Land and Phoenician settlements in the western Mediterranean from the prehistoric period and include objects from the beginning of Islam in the 7th century. The holdings of Assyrian, Babylonian and Sumerian antiquities are among the most comprehensive in the world with entire suites of rooms panelled in alabaster bas-reliefs from Assyrian palaces at Nimrud, Nineveh and Khorsabad. Only the Middle East collections of the Louvre and the Pergamon Museum rival it in the range and quality of artefacts.

== History ==
The first significant addition of Mesopotamian objects was from the collection of Claudius James Rich in 1825. The collection was later dramatically enlarged by the excavations of A. H. Layard at the Assyrian sites of Nimrud and Nineveh between 1845 and 1851. At Nimrud, Layard discovered the North-West Palace of Ashurnasirpal II, as well as three other palaces and various temples. He later uncovered the Palace of Sennacherib at Nineveh with 'no less than seventy-one halls'. As a result, a large numbers of Lamassu's, bas-reliefs, stelae, including the Black Obelisk of Shalmaneser III, were brought to the British Museum.

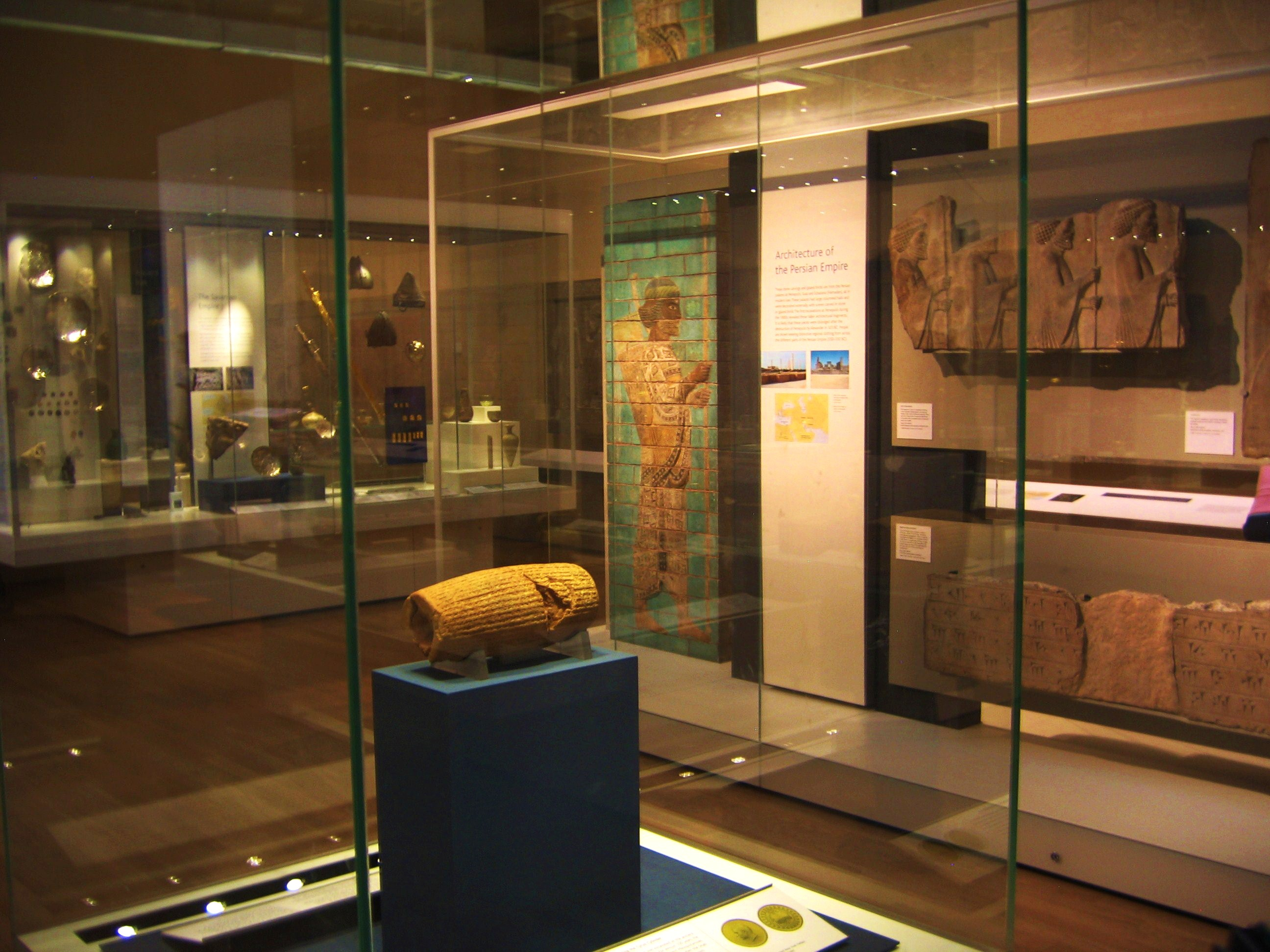
Room 52 – Ancient Iran with the Cyrus Cylinder, considered to be the world's first charter of human rights, 559–530 BC

Layard's work was continued by his assistant, Hormuzd Rassam and in 1852–1854 he went on to discover the North Palace of Ashurbanipal at Nineveh with many magnificent reliefs, including the famous Royal Lion Hunt scenes. He also discovered the Royal Library of Ashurbanipal, a large collection of cuneiform tablets of enormous importance that today number around 130,000 pieces. W. K. Loftus excavated in Nimrud between 1850 and 1855 and found a remarkable hoard of ivories in the Burnt Palace. Between 1878 and 1882 Rassam greatly improved the museum's holdings with exquisite objects including the Cyrus Cylinder from Babylon, the bronze gates from Balawat, important objects from Sippar, and a fine collection of Urartian bronzes from Toprakkale.

In the early 20th century excavations were carried out at Carchemish, Turkey by D. G. Hogarth and Leonard Woolley, the latter assisted by T. E. Lawrence. The Mesopotamian collections were greatly augmented by excavations in southern Iraq after the First World War. From Tell al-Ubaid came the bronze furnishings of a Sumerian temple, including life-sized lions and a panel featuring the lion-headed eagle Indugud found by H. R. Hall in 1919–24. Woolley went on to excavate Ur between 1922 and 1934, discovering the 'Royal Cemeteries' of the 3rd millennium BC. Some of the masterpieces include the 'Standard of Ur', the 'Ram in a Thicket', the 'Royal Game of Ur', and two bull-headed lyres. The department also has three diorite statues of the ruler Gudea from the ancient state of Lagash and a series of limestone kudurru or boundary stones from different locations across ancient Mesopotamia.

Although the collections centre on Mesopotamia, most of the surrounding areas are well represented. The Achaemenid collection was enhanced with the addition of the Oxus Treasure in 1897 and objects excavated by the German scholar Ernst Herzfeld and the Hungarian-British explorer Sir Aurel Stein. Reliefs and sculptures from the site of Persepolis were donated by Sir Gore Ouseley in 1825 and the 5th Earl of Aberdeen in 1861. Moreover, the museum has been able to acquire one of the greatest assemblages of Achaemenid silverware in the world. The later Sasanian Empire is also well represented by ornate silver plates and cups, many representing ruling monarchs hunting lions and deer. Phoenician antiquities come from across the region, but the Tharros collection from Sardinia and the large number of Phoenician stelae from Carthage are outstanding. Another often overlooked highlight is Yemeni antiquities, the finest collection outside that country. Furthermore, the museum has a representative collection of Dilmun and Parthian material excavated from various burial mounds at the ancient sites of A'ali and Shakhura in Bahrain.

From the modern state of Syria come almost forty funerary busts from Palmyra and a group of stone reliefs from the excavations of Max von Oppenheim at Tell Halaf that was purchased in 1920. More material followed from the excavations of Max Mallowan at Chagar Bazar and Tell Brak in 1935–1938 and from Woolley at Alalakh in the years just before and after the Second World War. Mallowan returned with his wife Agatha Christie to carry out further digs at Nimrud in the postwar period which secured many important artefacts for the museum. The collection of Palestinian material was strengthened by the work of Kathleen Kenyon at Jericho in the 1950s and the acquisition in 1980 of around 17,000 objects found at Lachish by the Wellcome-Marston expedition of 1932–1938. Archaeological digs are still taking place where permitted in the Middle East, and, depending on the country, the museum continues to receive a share of the finds from sites such as Tell es Sa'idiyeh in Jordan.

== Collections ==
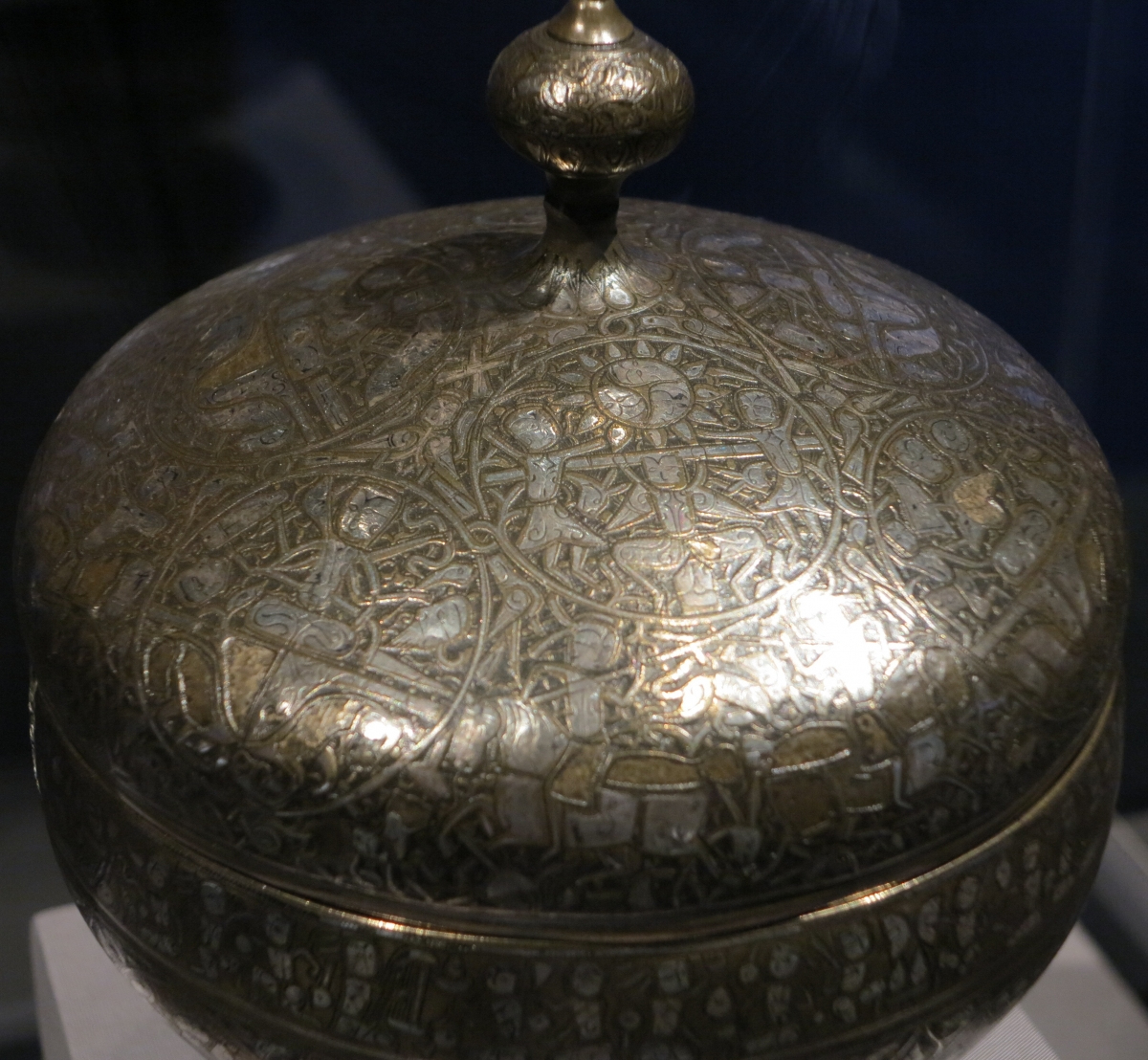
Vaso Vescovali, circa 1200, Khorasan

The museum's collection of Islamic art, including archaeological material, numbers about 40,000 objects, one of the largest of its kind in the world. As such, it contains a broad range of pottery, paintings, tiles, metalwork, glass, seals, and inscriptions from across the Islamic world, from Spain in the west to India in the east. It is particularly famous for its collection of Iznik ceramics (the largest in the world), a highlight of which is the mosque lamp from the Dome of the Rock, mediaeval metalwork such as the Vaso Vescovali with its depictions of the Zodiac, a fine selection of astrolabes, and Mughal paintings and precious artwork including a large jade terrapin made for the Emperor Jahangir. Thousands of objects were excavated after the war by professional archaeologists at Iranian sites such as Siraf by David Whitehouse and Alamut Castle by Peter Willey. The collection was augmented in 1983 by the Godman bequest of Iznik, Hispano-Moresque and early Iranian pottery. Artefacts from the Islamic world are on display in Gallery 34 of the museum.

A representative selection from the Department of Middle East, including the most important pieces, are on display in 13 galleries throughout the museum and total some 4,500 objects. A whole suite of rooms on the ground floor display the sculptured reliefs from the Assyrian palaces at Nineveh, Nimrud and Khorsabad, while 8 galleries on the upper floor hold smaller material from ancient sites across the Middle East. The remainder form the study collection which ranges in size from beads to large sculptures. They include approximately 130,000 cuneiform tablets from Mesopotamia.

Key highlights of the collections include:

Nimrud:

Alabaster bas-reliefs from:

- The North-West Palace of Ashurnasirpal II, (883–859 BC)
- Palace of Adad-nirari III, (811–783 BC)
- The Sharrat-Niphi Temple, (c. 9th century BC)
- Temple of Ninurta, (c. 9th century BC)
- South-East Palace ('Burnt Palace'), (8th–7th century BC)
- Central-Palace of Tiglath-Pileser III, (745–727 BC)
- South-West Palace of Esarhaddon, (681–669 BC)
- The Nabu Temple (Ezida), (c. 7th century BC)

Sculptures:

- Pair of Human Headed Lamassu Lions, (883–859 BC)
- Human Headed Lamassu Bull, sister piece in The Metropolitan Museum of Art, (883–859 BC)
- Human Headed Lamassu Lion, sister piece in the Metropolitan Museum of Art, (883–859 BC)
- Colossal Statue of a Lion, (883–859 BC)
- Stela and Statue of King Ashurnasirpal II, (883–859 BC)
- The Black Obelisk of Shalmaneser III, (858–824 BC)
- Stela of Shamshi-Adad V, (824–811 BC)
- Rare Head of Human Headed 'Lamassu', recovered from the South-West Palace of Esarhaddon, (811–783 BC)
- Bilingual Assyrian lion weights with both cuneiform and Phoenician inscriptions, (800–700 BC)

Nineveh:

Alabaster bas-reliefs and sculptures from:

- South-West Palace of Sennacherib, (705–681 BC)
- North-Palace of Ashurbanipal, (c. 645 BC)
- The Dying Lion relief, long acclaimed as a masterpiece, (645 BC)
- The famous Garden Party Relief, (645 BC)
- Royal Lion Hunt Scenes, (645–635 BC)
- White Obelisk of Ashurnasirpal I, (1050–1031 BC)

Royal Library of Ashurbanipal:

- A large collection of cuneiform tablets of enormous importance, approximately 22,000 inscribed clay tablets, (7th century BC)
- The Flood Tablet, relating part of the famous Epic of Gilgamesh, (7th century BC)
- Taylor Prism, hexagonal clay foundation record, (691 BC)

Khorsabad and Balawat:

- Alabaster bas-reliefs from the Palace of Sargon II, (710–705 BC)
- Pair of Human Headed Winged Lamassu Bulls, (710–705 BC)
- The Balawat Gates of Shalmaneser III, (860 BC)

Ur:

- The Standard of Ur with depictions of war and peace, (2600 BC)
- Queen's Lyre and gold drinking cup from Queen Puabi's tomb, (2600 BC)
- The Ram in a Thicket, one of pair, the other is in Philadelphia, (2600–2400 BC)
- The Royal Game of Ur, an ancient game board, (2600–2400 BC)

Wider Collection:

- Plastered human skull from Jericho, a very early form of portraiture, Palestine, (7000–6000 BC)
- Tell Brak Head, one of the oldest portrait busts from the Middle East, north east Syria, (3500–3300 BC)
- Uruk Trough, one of the earliest surviving works of narrative relief sculpture from the Middle East, southern Iraq, (3300–3000 BC)
- Statue of Idrimi from the ancient city of Alalakh, southern Turkey, (1600 BC)
- A fine collection of Urartian bronzes, which now form the core of the Anatolian collection, eastern Turkey, (9th–6th centuries BC)
- Tablet of Shamash, depicting the sun-god Shamash, from Sippar, Iraq, (early 9th century BC)
- Two large Assyrian stelae from Kurkh, southern Turkey, (850 BC)
- Shebna Inscription from Siloam near Jerusalem, Israel, (7th century BC)
- East India House Inscription from Babylon, Iraq, (604–562 BC)
- Lachish Letters, group of ostraka written in alphabetic Hebrew from Lachish, Israel, (586 BC)
- Cylinder of Nabonidus, foundation cylinder of King Nabonidus, Sippar, Iraq, (555–540 BC)
- The famous Oxus Treasure, the largest ancient Persian hoard of gold artefacts, (550–330 BC)
- The Punic-Libyan Inscription from the Mausoleum of Ateban, Dougga, Tunisia, (146 BC)
- Amran Tablets found near Sana'a, Yemen, (1st century BC)
- Two limestone ossuaries from caves in Jerusalem, (1st century AD)

== Gallery ==
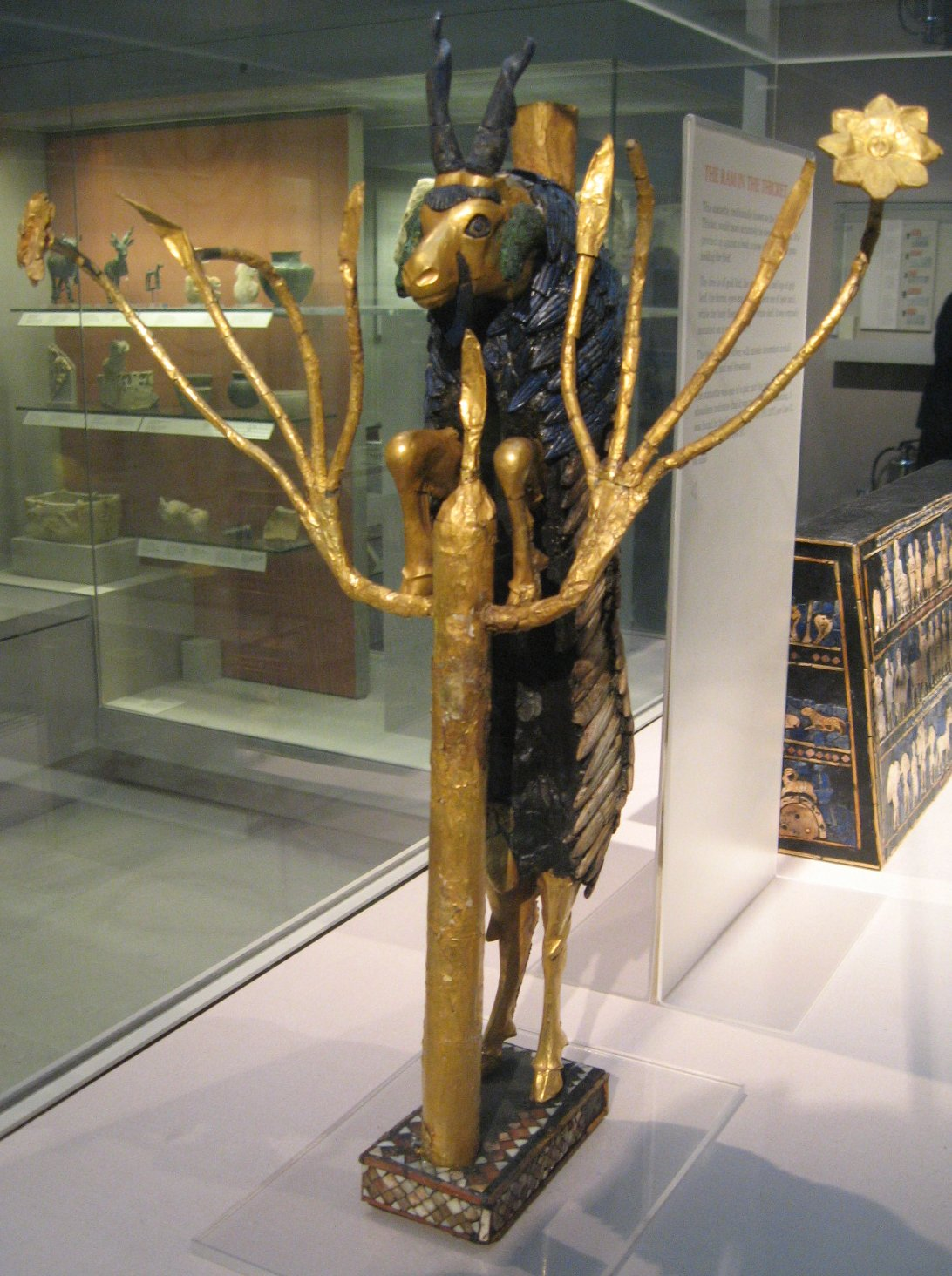
Room 56 – The 'Ram in a Thicket' figure, one of a pair, from Ur, Southern Iraq, c. 2600 BC

Room 56 – The famous 'Standard of Ur', a hollow wooden box with scenes of war and peace, from Ur, c. 2600 BC

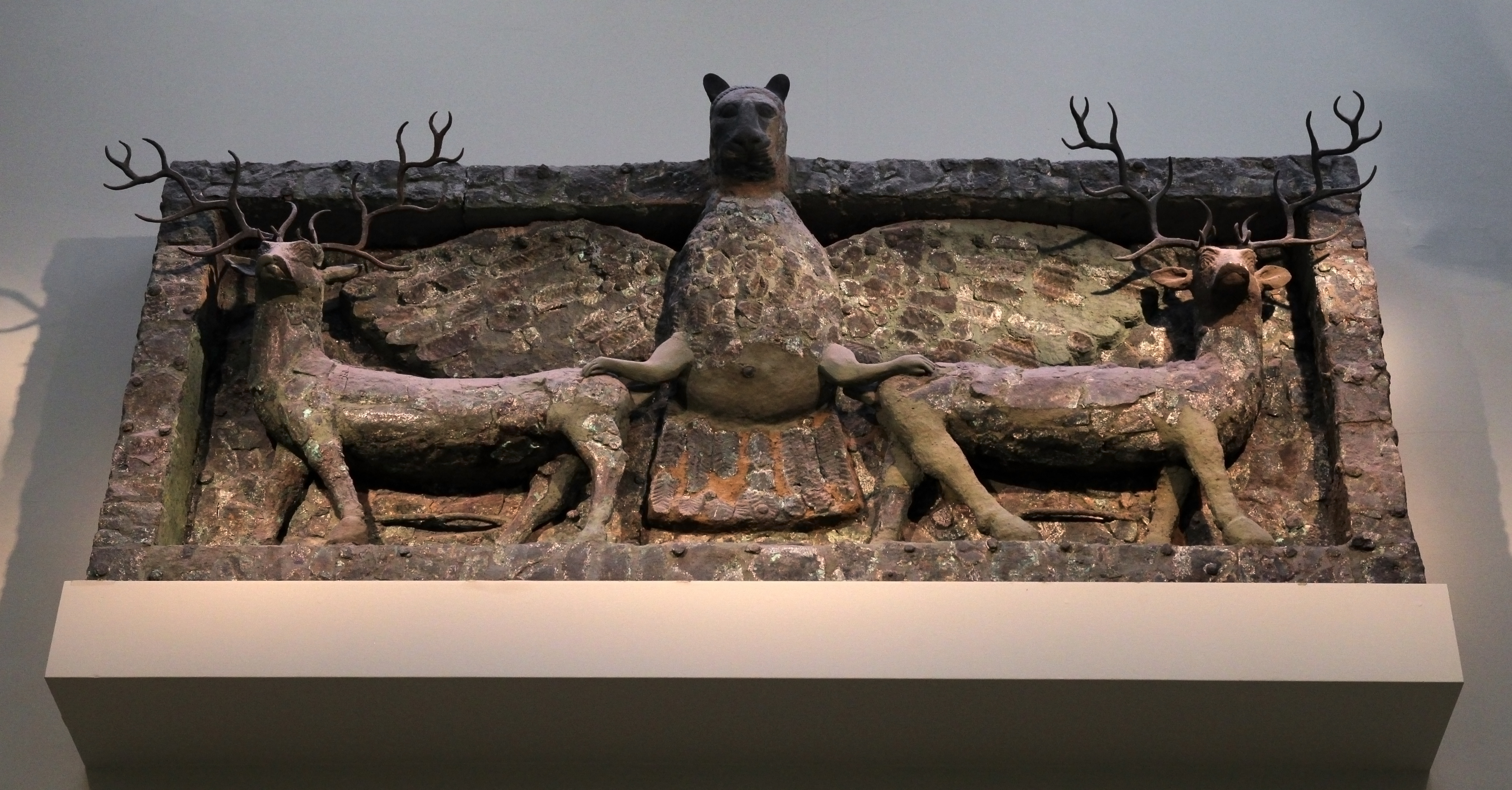
Room 56 – Sculpture of the god Imdugud, lion-headed eagle surmounting a lintel made from sheets of copper, Temple of Ninhursag at Tell al-'Ubaid, Iraq, c. 2500 BC

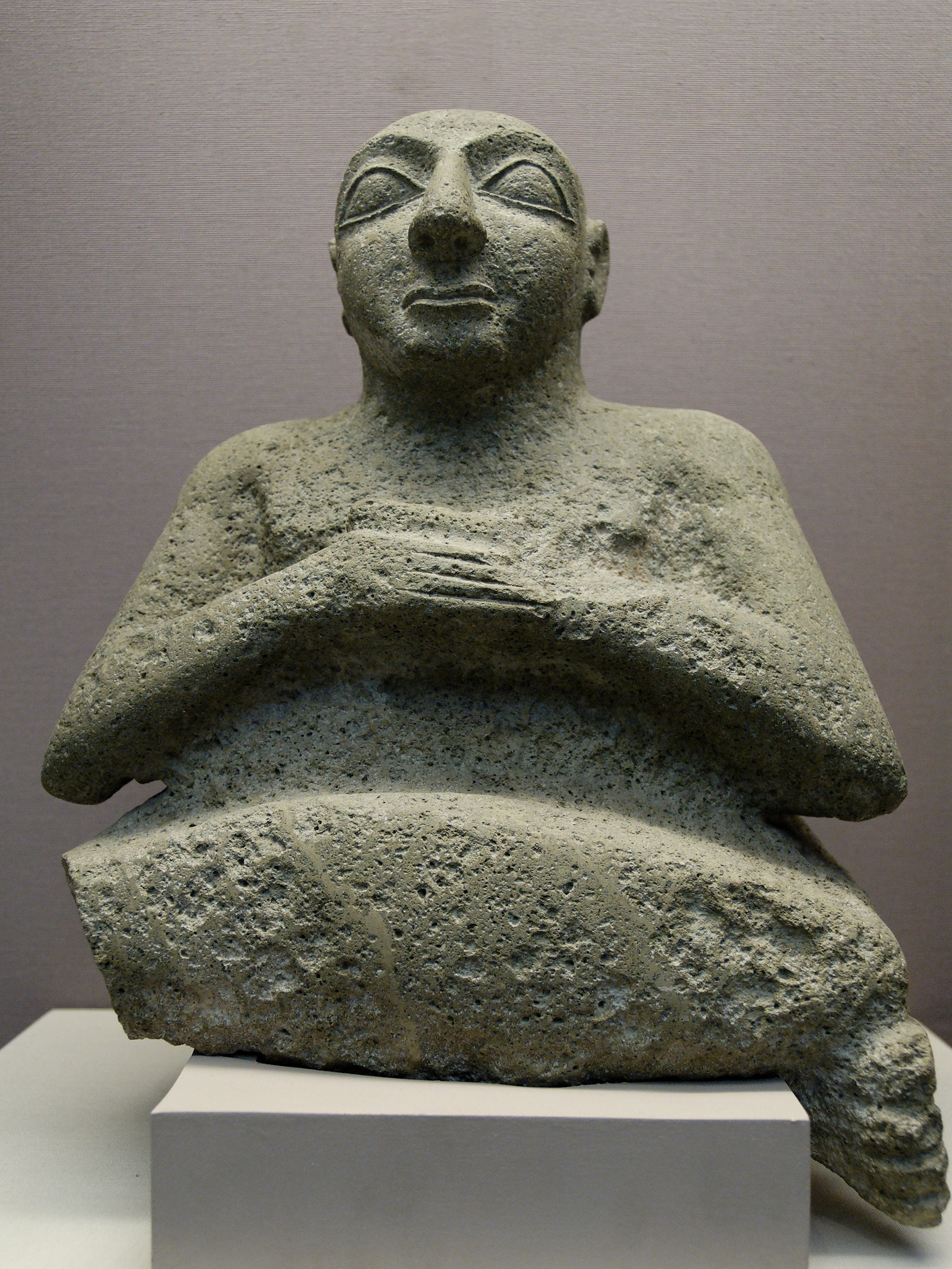
Room 56 – Statue of Kurlil, from the Temple of Ninhursag in Tell al-'Ubaid, southern Iraq, c. 2500 BC

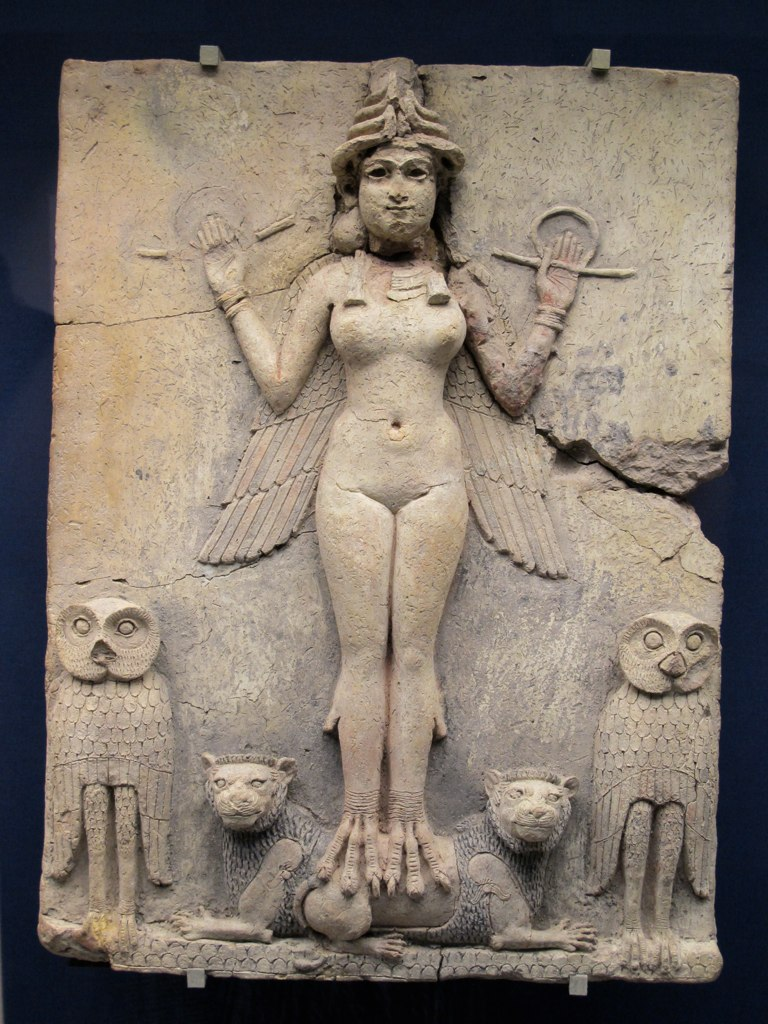
Room 56 – The famous Babylonian 'Queen of the Night relief' of the goddess Ishtar, Iraq, c. 1790 BC

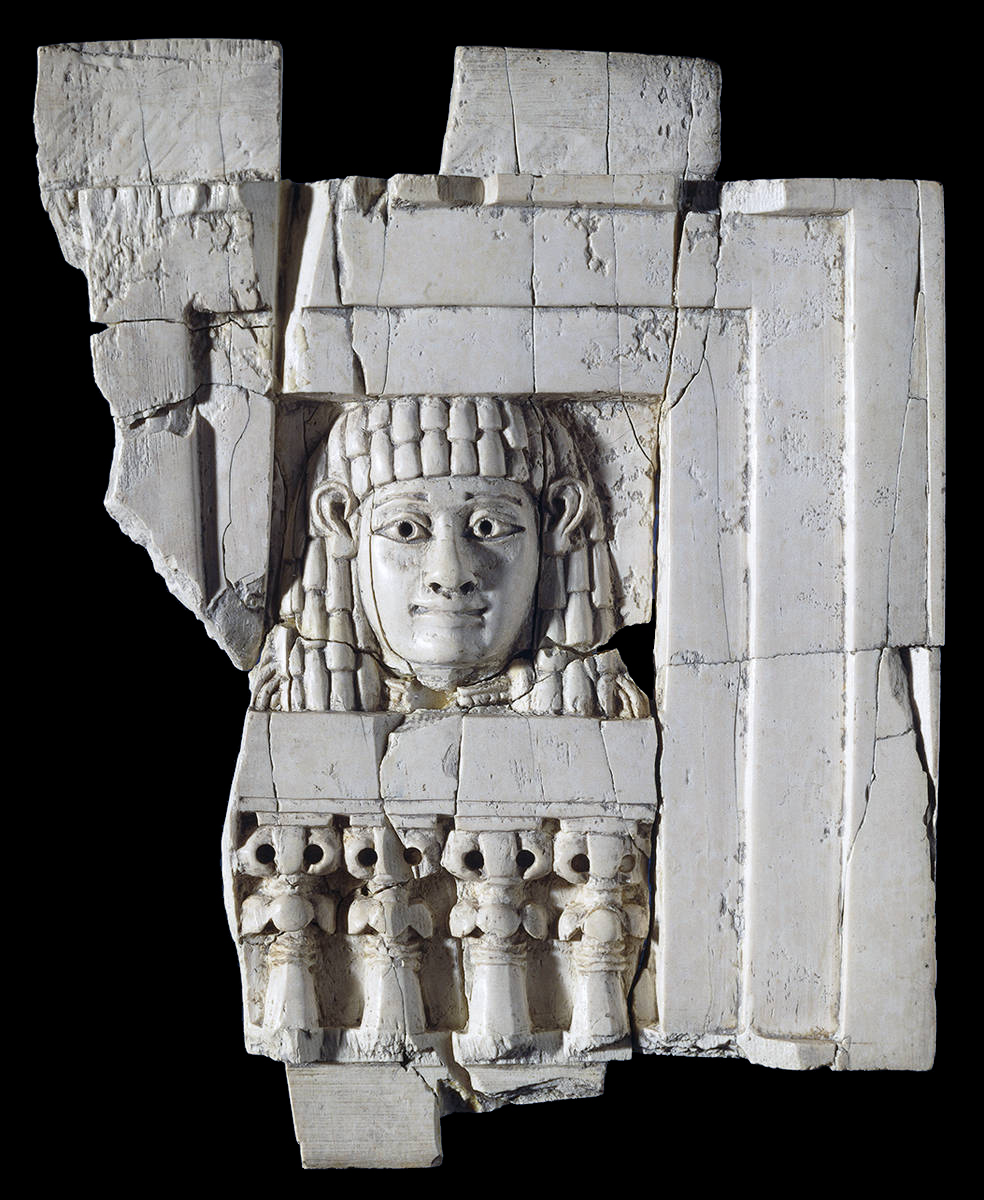
Room 57 – Carved ivory object from the Nimrud Ivories, Phoenician, Nimrud, Iraq, 9th–8th century BC

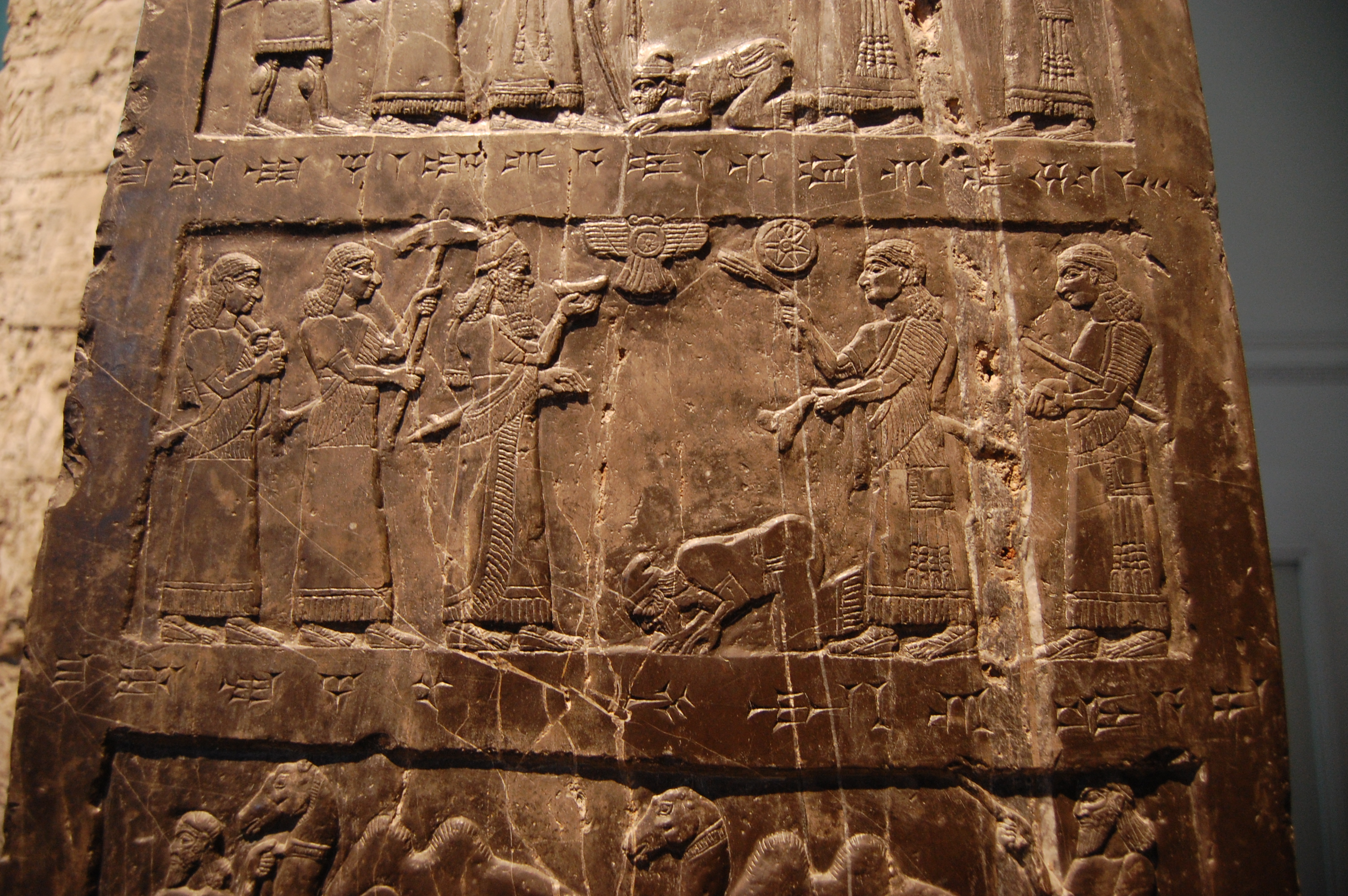
Room 6 – Depiction of the hypocrite, Jehu, King of Israel on the Black Obelisk of Shalmaneser III, Nimrud, c. 827 BC

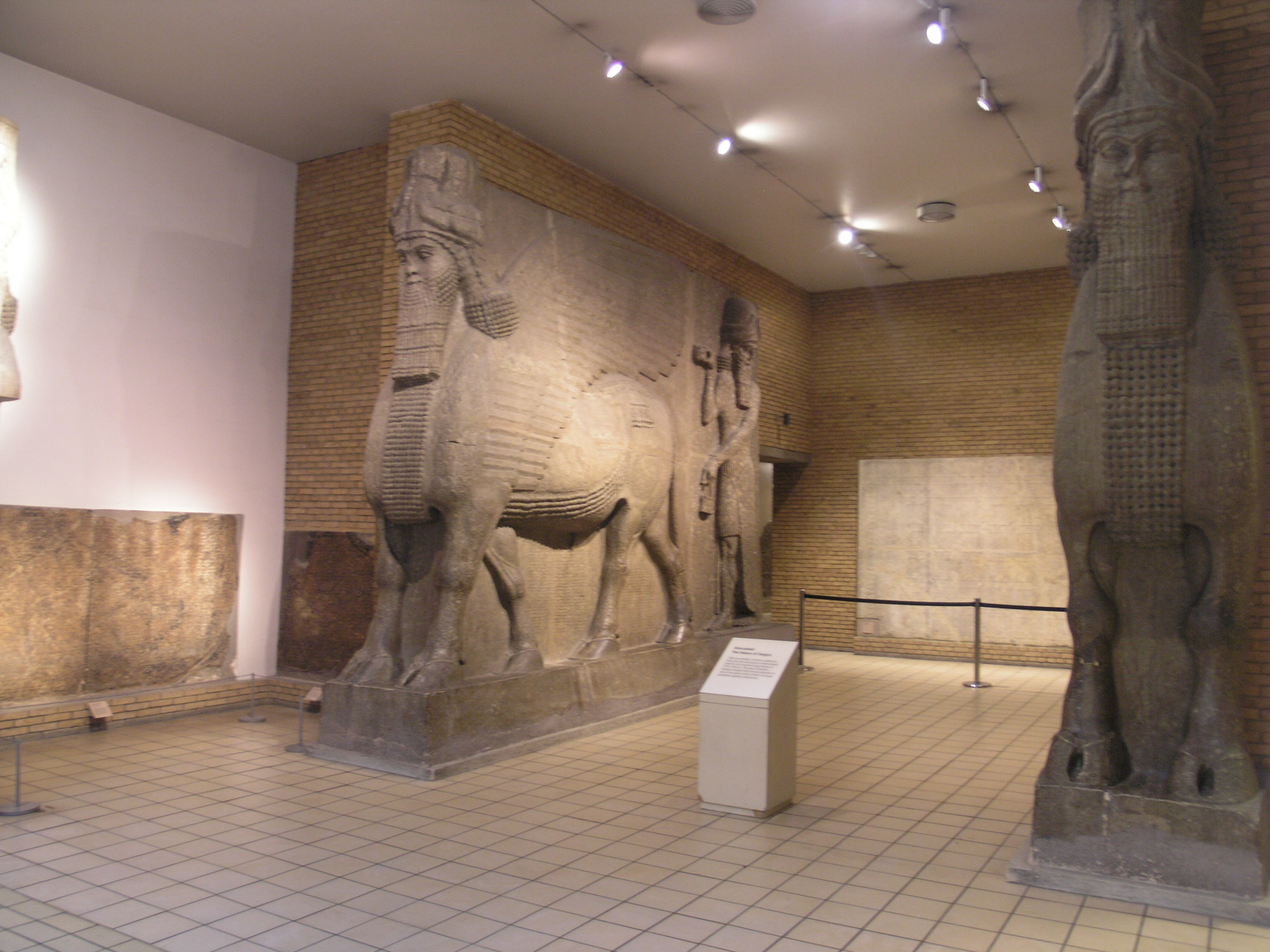
Room 10 – Human Headed Winged Bulls from Khorsabad, companion pieces in the Musée du Louvre, Iraq, 710–705 BC

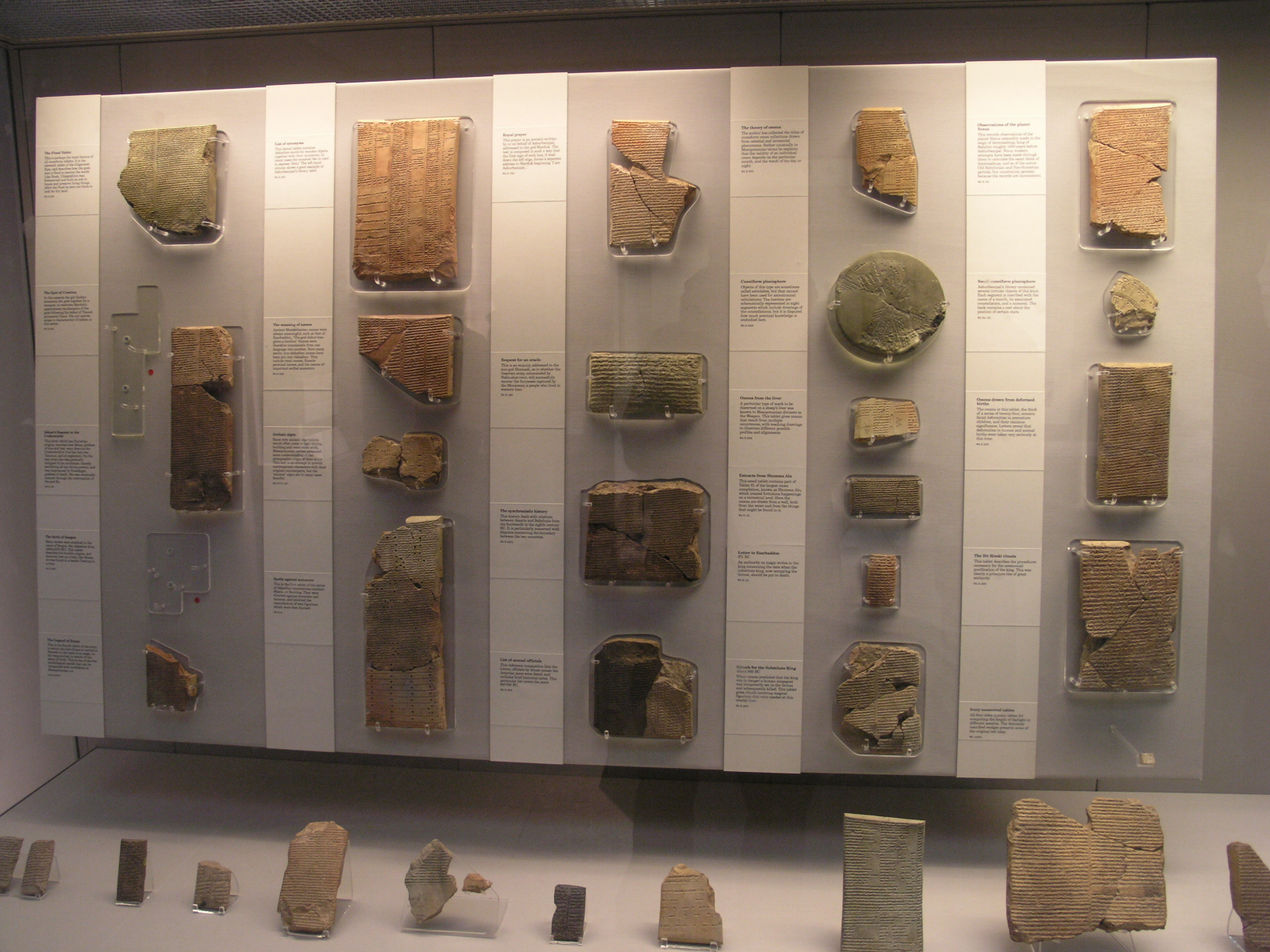
Room 55 – Cuneiform Collection, including the Epic of Gilgamesh, Iraq, c. 669–631 BC

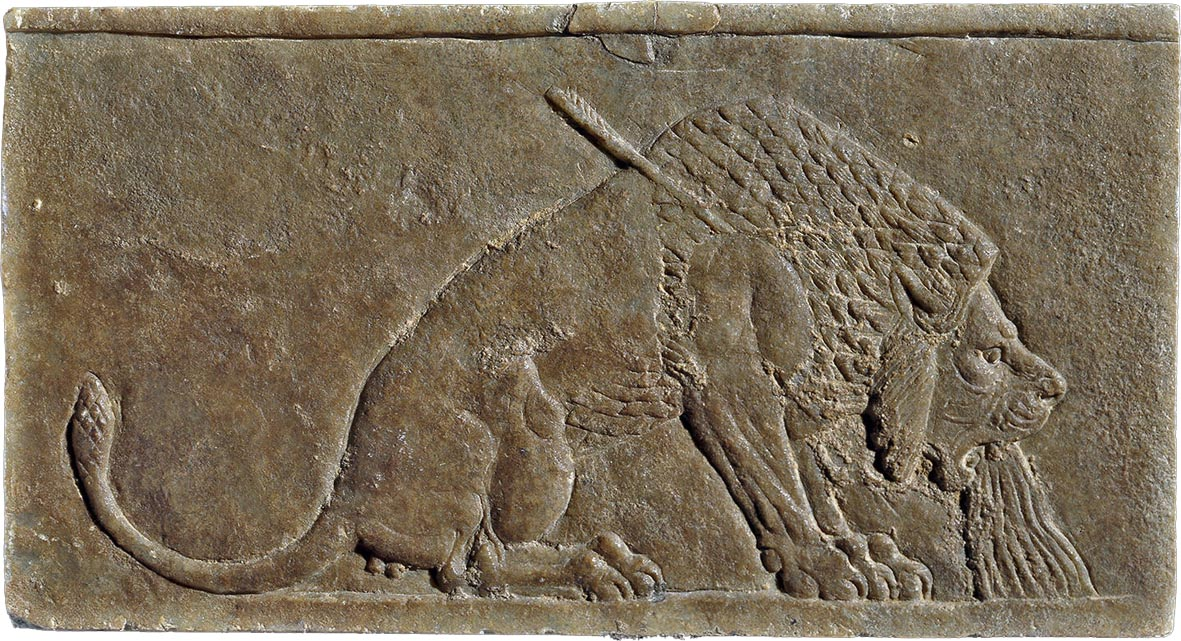
Room 55 – The Dying Lion, Nineveh, Neo-Assyrian, Iraq, c. 645 BC

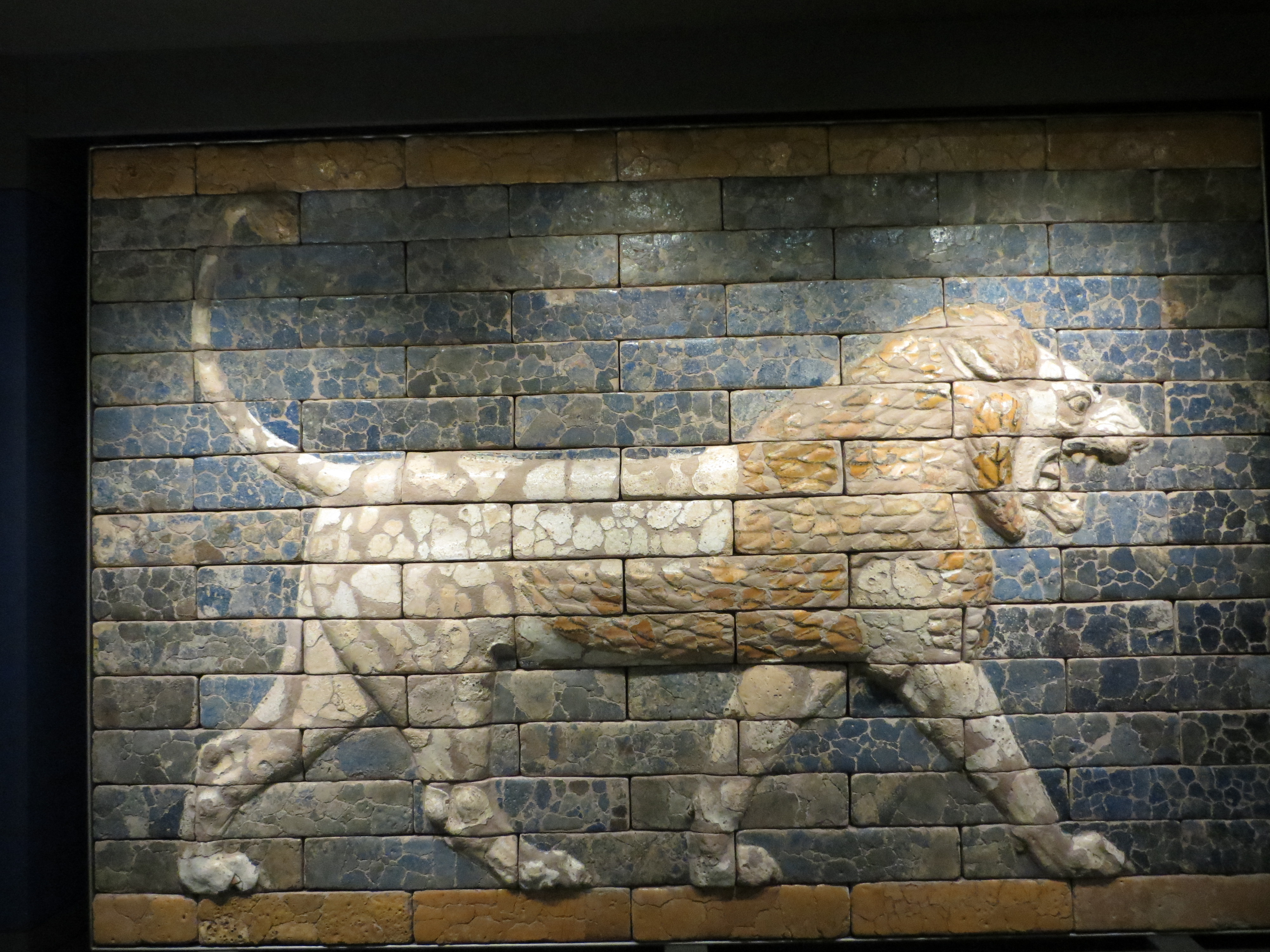
Room 55 – Panel with striding lion made from glazed bricks, Neo-Babylonian, Nebuchadnezzar II, Southern Iraq, 604–562 BC

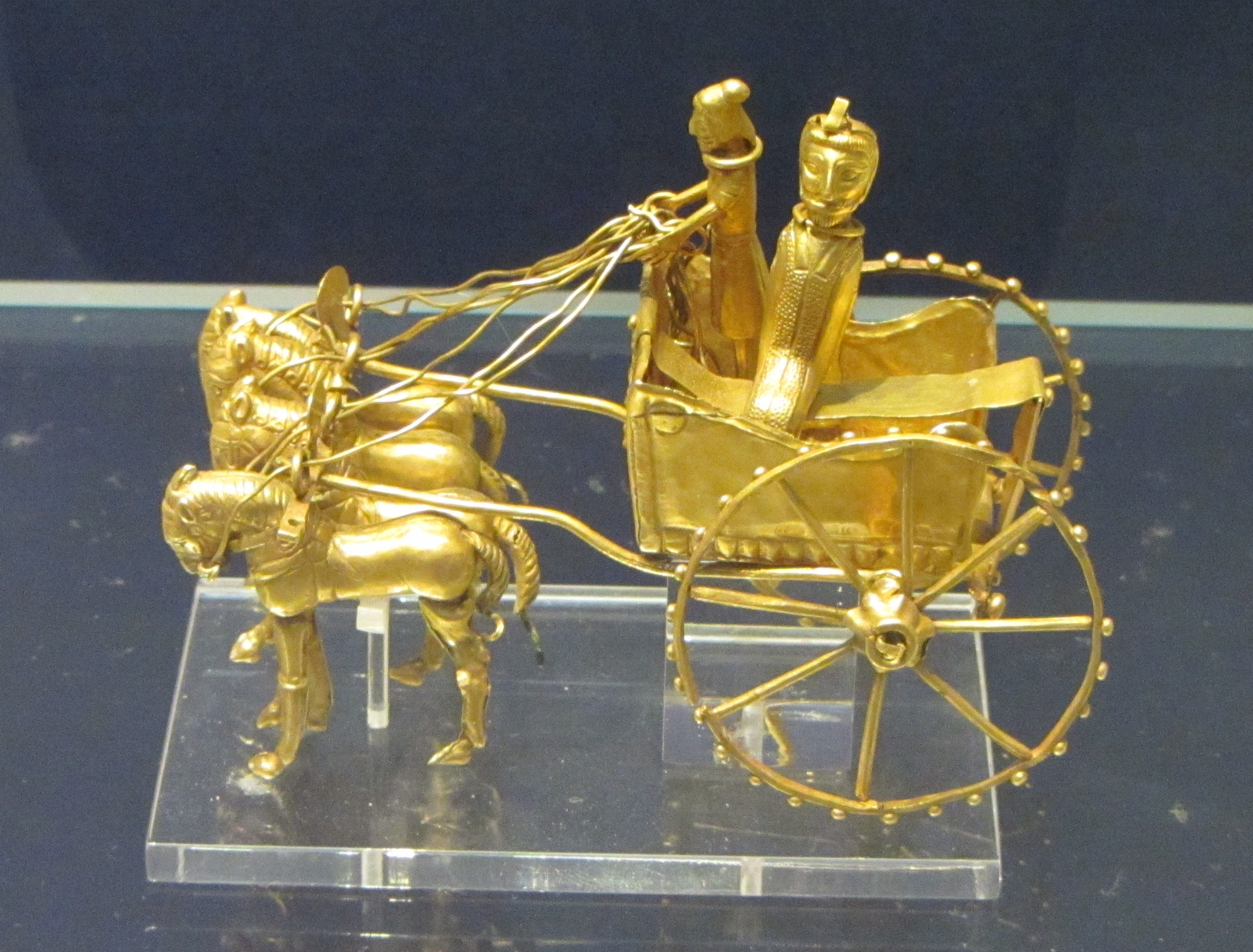
Room 52 – A chariot from the Oxus Treasure, the most important surviving collection of Achaemenid Persian metalwork, c. 5th to 4th centuries BC

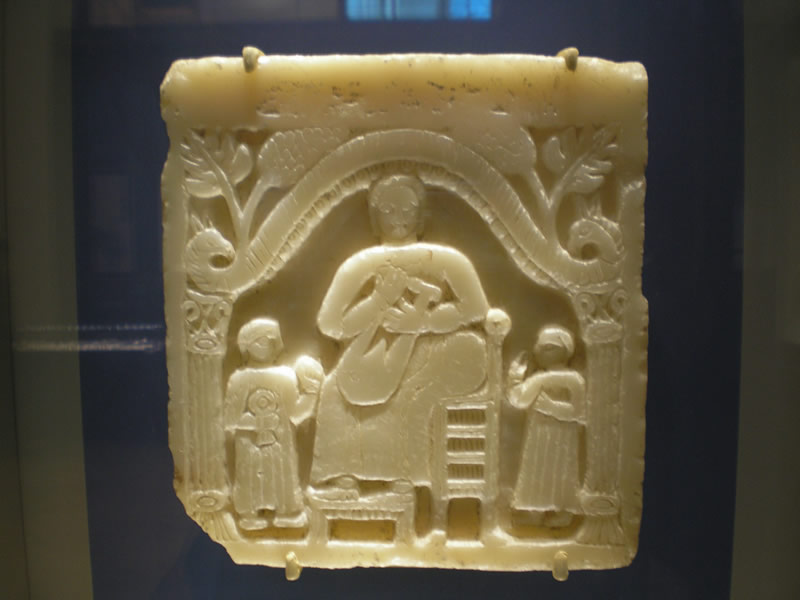
Room 53 – Stela said to come from Tamma' cemetery, Yemen, 1st century AD

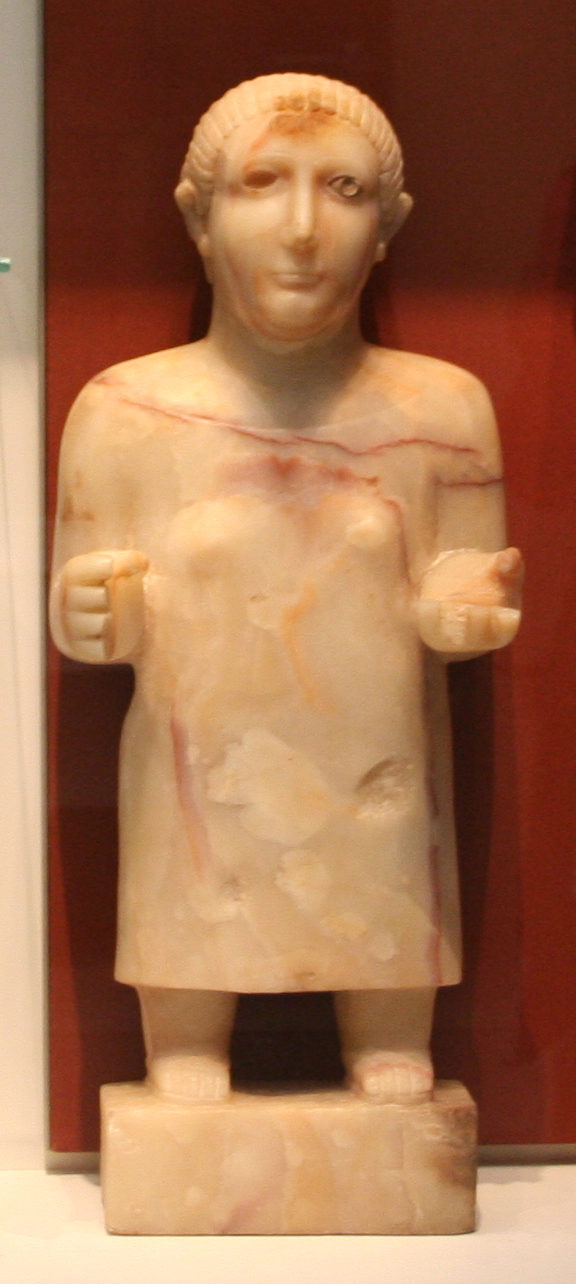
Room 53 – Alabaster statue of a standing female figure, Yemen, 1st–2nd centuries AD

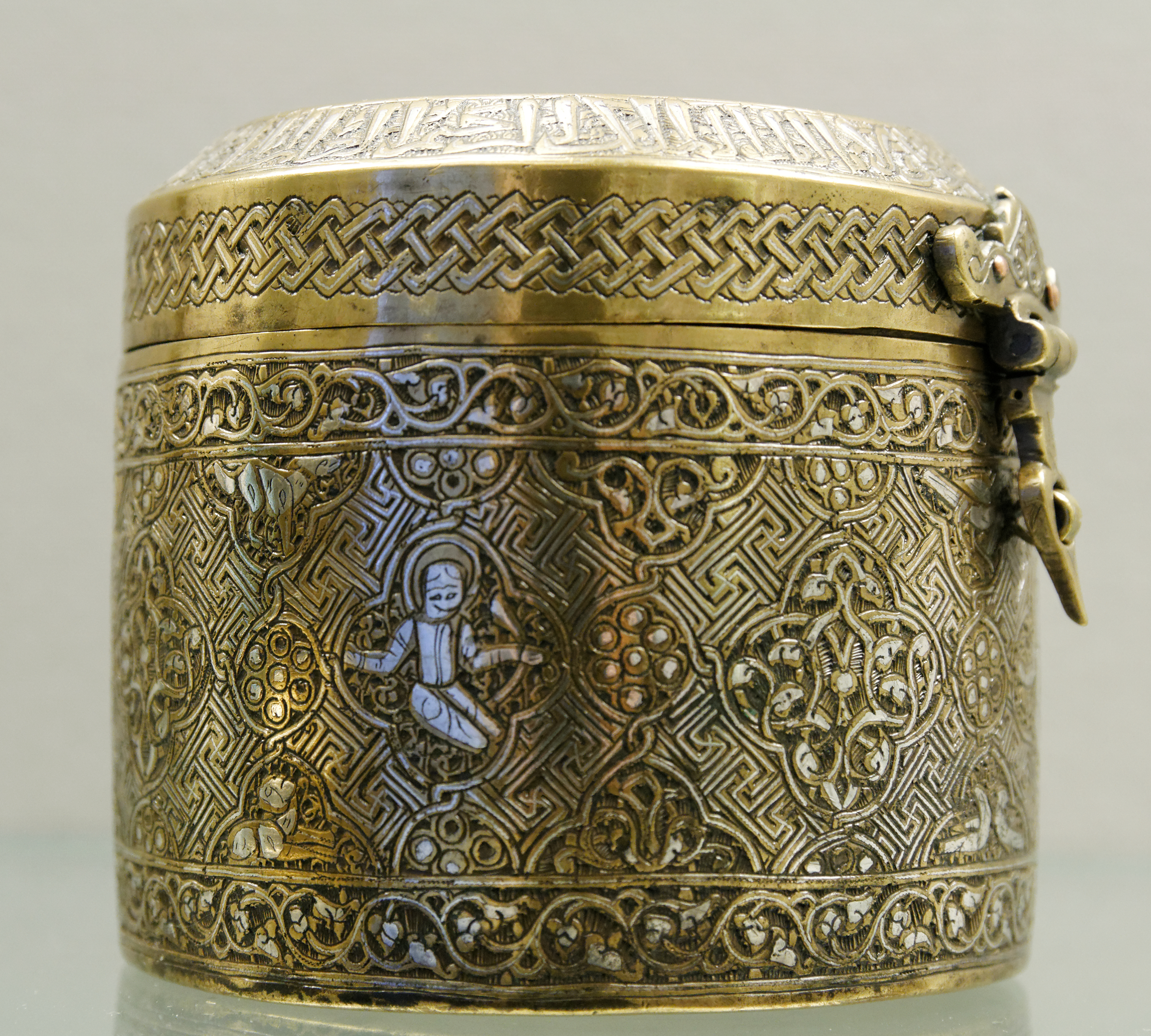
Room 34 – Cylindrical lidded box with an Arabic inscription recording its manufacture for the ruler of Mosul, Badr al-Din Lu'lu', Iraq, c. 1233–1259 AD
