= Terence Mitchell =

British archaeologist, scholar, and curator (1929–2019)

T. C. Mitchell
- Born: Terence Croft Mitchell; 17 June 1929
- Died: 21 April 2019 (aged 89)
- Citizenship: United Kingdom
- Title: Keeper of Western Asiatic Antiquities (1985–1989)

Academic background
- Education: St Catharine's College, Cambridge

Academic work
- Discipline: Archaeology and biblical studies
- Sub-discipline: West Semitic languages; Near Eastern archaeology; Biblical archaeology; Sumer; Babylonia
- Institutions: British Museum

Terence Croft Mitchell (17 June 1929 – 21 April 2019) was a British archaeologist, scholar and curator. He was Keeper of Western Asiatic Antiquities at the British Museum from 1985 to 1989. He specialised in West Semitic languages, Near Eastern archaeology, and also took an interest in Biblical matters from an evangelical Christian position.

== Early life and education ==
Mitchell was born on 17 June 1929 to Arthur Croft Mitchell (1872-1956), a landscape artist, and his wife Evelyn Violet Mitchell (née Ware). He was educated at Holderness School, New Hampshire, United States (where he was an evacuee during the Second World War), and at Bradfield College in England Between school and university, he undertook his military service as a craftsman in the Royal Electrical and Mechanical Engineers, British Army from 1947 to 1949. He went on to study archaeology and anthropology at St Catharine's College, Cambridge. Among his university tutors was Margaret Munn-Rankin, who inspired him to specialise in the ancient Near East.

== Career ==
From 1954 to 1956, he was an assistant master (teacher) at St Catherine's School, a boarding school in Almondsbury, Gloucestershire. A devout Christian, he undertook study at Tyndale House, an evangelical biblical studies library in Cambridge, between 1956 and 1958. He then worked as the "European representative" for the Australian Institute of Archaeology, a biblical archaeology organisation, from 1958 to 1959.

In 1959, Mitchell joined the British Museum as a curator in its Department of Western Asiatic Antiquities: he would remain at the museum until retirement. He edited and prepared for publication the final three reports from Sir Leonard Woolley's excavations at Ur (published in 1962, 1965 and 1972). He joined the committee of the Palestine Exploration Fund in 1968, and served as its Honorary Librarian from 1972 to 1985. At the British Museum, he was promoted to deputy keeper of his department in 1974, and was acting keeper from 1983 to 1985. He was appointed Keeper of Western Asiatic Antiquities in 1985, in succession to Edmond Sollberger. In addition to leading the department, he researched and published The Bible in the British Museum (1988). He retired in 1989.

== Personal life ==
Mitchell never married nor had any children.

An evangelical Christian, he was a member of Westminster Chapel in the last three decades of his life. He had served as lay chair of the Church of England's Chelsea Deanery Synod from 1981 to 1984. He was chair of Faith and Thought, a Christian creationist society, from 1986 to 2009.

Mitchel died on 21 April 2019, aged 89. A Festschrift had been prepared to celebrate his 90th birthday, but he died before it was published.

== Selected works ==
- Woolley, Leonard (1962). Mitchell, T. C. (ed.). Ur Excavations, IX: The Neo-Babylonian and Persian Periods. London: The British Museum.
- Woolley, Leonard (1965). Mitchell, T. C. (ed.). Ur Excavations, VIII: The Kassite Period and the Period of the Assyrian Kings. London: The British Museum.
- Mitchell, T. C. (1969). Sumerian art: illustrated by objects from Ur and Al-'Ubaid. London: The British Museum Press.
- Woolley, Leonard; Mallowan, Max (1976). Mitchell, T. C. (ed.). Ur excavations, VII: The Old Babylonian period. London: British Museum Publications.
- Mitchell, T. C. (1988). Biblical archaeology: documents from the British Museum. Cambridge: Cambridge University Press. ISBN 978-0521363235.
- Mitchell, T. C. (1988). The Bible in the British Museum: interpreting the evidence. London: The British Museum Press.
- T. C. Mitchell (1992). "29: Israel and Judah from the coming of Assyrian domination until the fall of Samaria, and the struggle for independence in Judah (c. 750–700 B.C.)". In John Boardman; I. E. S. Edwards; E. Sollberger; N. G. L. Hammond (eds.). The Cambridge Ancient History, Volume 3, Part 2: The Assyrian and Babylonian Empires and Other States of the Near East, from the Eighth to the Sixth Centuries BC. Cambridge University Press. pp. 322–370. ISBN 978-0521227179.
- T. C. Mitchell (1992). "30: Judah until the fall of Jerusalem (c. 700–586 B.C.)". In John Boardman; I. E. S. Edwards; E. Sollberger; N. G. L. Hammond (eds.). The Cambridge Ancient History, Volume 3, Part 2: The Assyrian and Babylonian Empires and Other States of the Near East, from the Eighth to the Sixth Centuries BC. Cambridge University Press. pp. 371–409. ISBN 978-0521227179.
- T. C. Mitchell (1992). "31: The Babylonian Exile and the restoration of the Jews in Palestine (586–c. 500 B.C.)". In John Boardman; I. E. S. Edwards; E. Sollberger; N. G. L. Hammond (eds.). The Cambridge Ancient History, Volume 3, Part 2: The Assyrian and Babylonian Empires and Other States of the Near East, from the Eighth to the Sixth Centuries BC. Cambridge University Press. pp. 410–460. ISBN 978-0521227179.
- Mitchell, T. C.; Searight, Ann (2008). Catalogue of the Western Asiatic seals in the British Museum: Stamp seals III: impressions of stamp seals on cuneiform tablets, clay bullae, and jar handles. Leiden: Brill. ISBN 978-9004156159.
