= Al-Ashmour =

Al-Ashmour الاشمور
- Sub-district
- Country: Yemen
- Governorate: 'Amran Governorate
- District: Amran District

Population (2004)
  - Total: 11,706
- Time zone: UTC+3

Al-Ashmour (Arabic: الاشمور) is a sub-district located in Amran District, 'Amran Governorate, Yemen. Al-Ashmour had a population of 11706 according to the 2004 census.
