= Ram Caught in a Thicket =

The phrase "ram caught in a thicket" may refer to

- the ram in the Biblical account in which God asks Abraham to sacrifice his son, as described in Binding of Isaac
- two third-millennium B.C. statues of rams (or goats) found in Mesopotamia, described in Ram in a Thicket
