= Al-Jannat =

al-Jannat الجنات
- Town
- Location in Yemen
- Coordinates: 15.68421°N 43.94223°E
- Country: Yemen
- Governorate: Amran
- District: Amran
- Elevation: 7,320 ft (2,230 m)
- Time zone: UTC+3 (Yemen Standard Time)

Al-Jannat (Arabic: الجنات al-Jannāt) is a small town in Amran District of 'Amran Governorate, Yemen. It is located about 2.5 km from 'Amran, the governorate capital, at the edge of the al-Bawn plain. Overlooking the town is the height called Jabal al-Jannat, where the historic fort called Qasr al-Jannat is located.

== History ==
During the middle ages, al-Jannat was more significant than 'Amran due to its strategic fortified location. Whereas 'Amran is largely absent from historical texts during this period, al-Jannat appears frequently in accounts such as the Ghayat al-amani of Yahya ibn al-Husayn and the Kitab al-Simt of Muhammad ibn Hatim al-Yami al-Hamdani, especially in the 13th century.
