= Amran 'Uzlah =

Amran عمران
- Sub-district
- Country: Yemen
- Governorate: 'Amran Governorate
- District: Amran District

Population (2004)
  - Total: 84,669
- Time zone: UTC+3

Amran (Arabic: عمران) is a sub-district located in Amran District, 'Amran Governorate, Yemen. Amran had a population of 84669 according to the 2004 census.
