= 'Amran =

City in Yemen

ʿAmrān عمران
- City
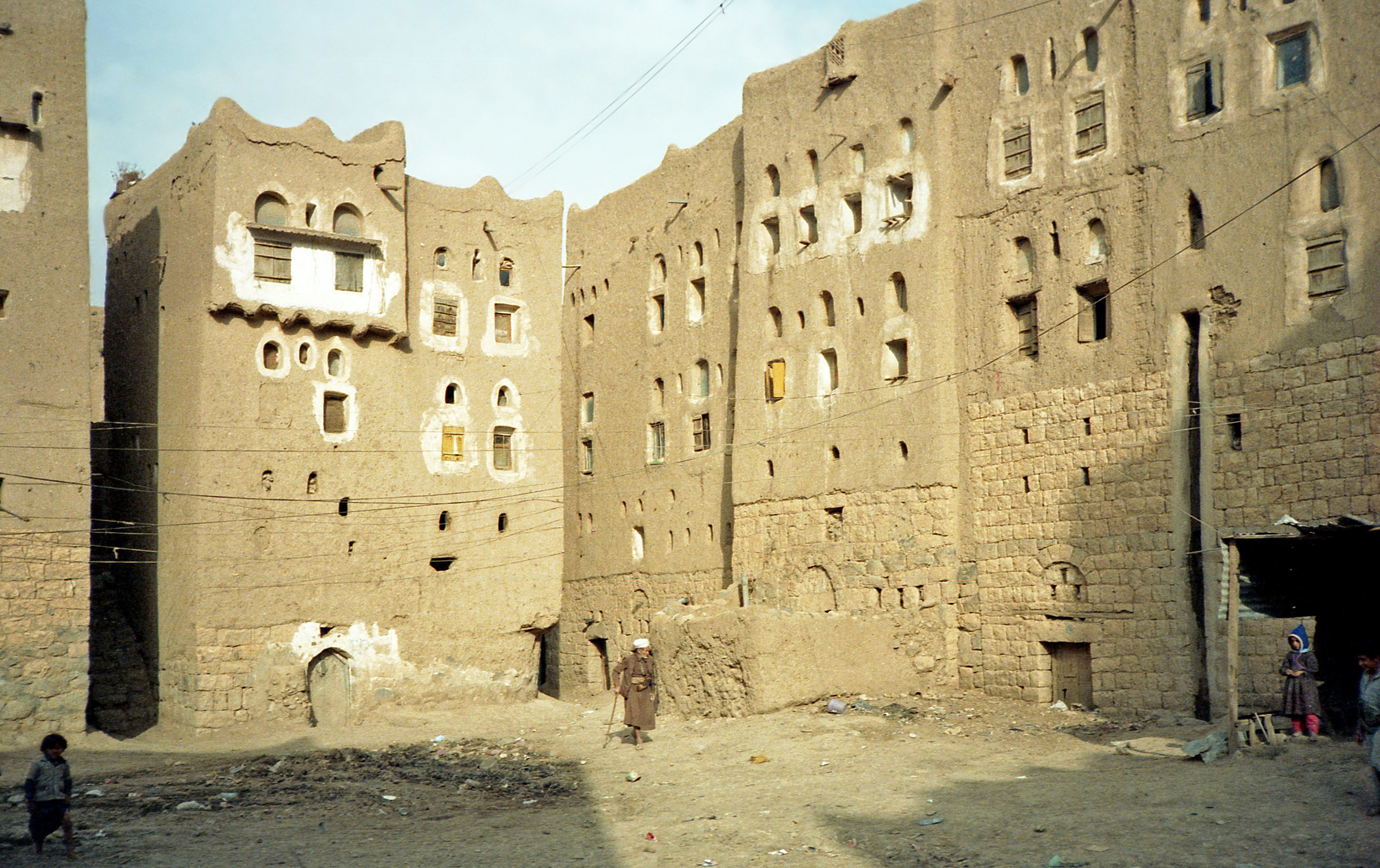

- Location in Yemen
- Coordinates: 15°40′N 43°57′E
- Country: Yemen
- Governorate: 'Amran Governorate
- District: Amran

Population (2013)
  - Total: 92,763
- Time zone: UTC+3 (Yemen Standard Time)

ʿAmrān (Arabic: عمران; Old South Arabian: 𐩲𐩣𐩧𐩬, romanized: ʿmrn) is a small city in western central Yemen. It is the capital of 'Amran Governorate, and was formerly part of Sana'a Governorate. It is located 52.9 kilometres (32.9 mi) by road northwest of the Yemeni capital of Sana'a, at the upper (southern) end of the al-Bawn plain. According to the 2004 census it had a population of 76,863, and an estimated population of 92,763 in 2013.

== History and architecture ==
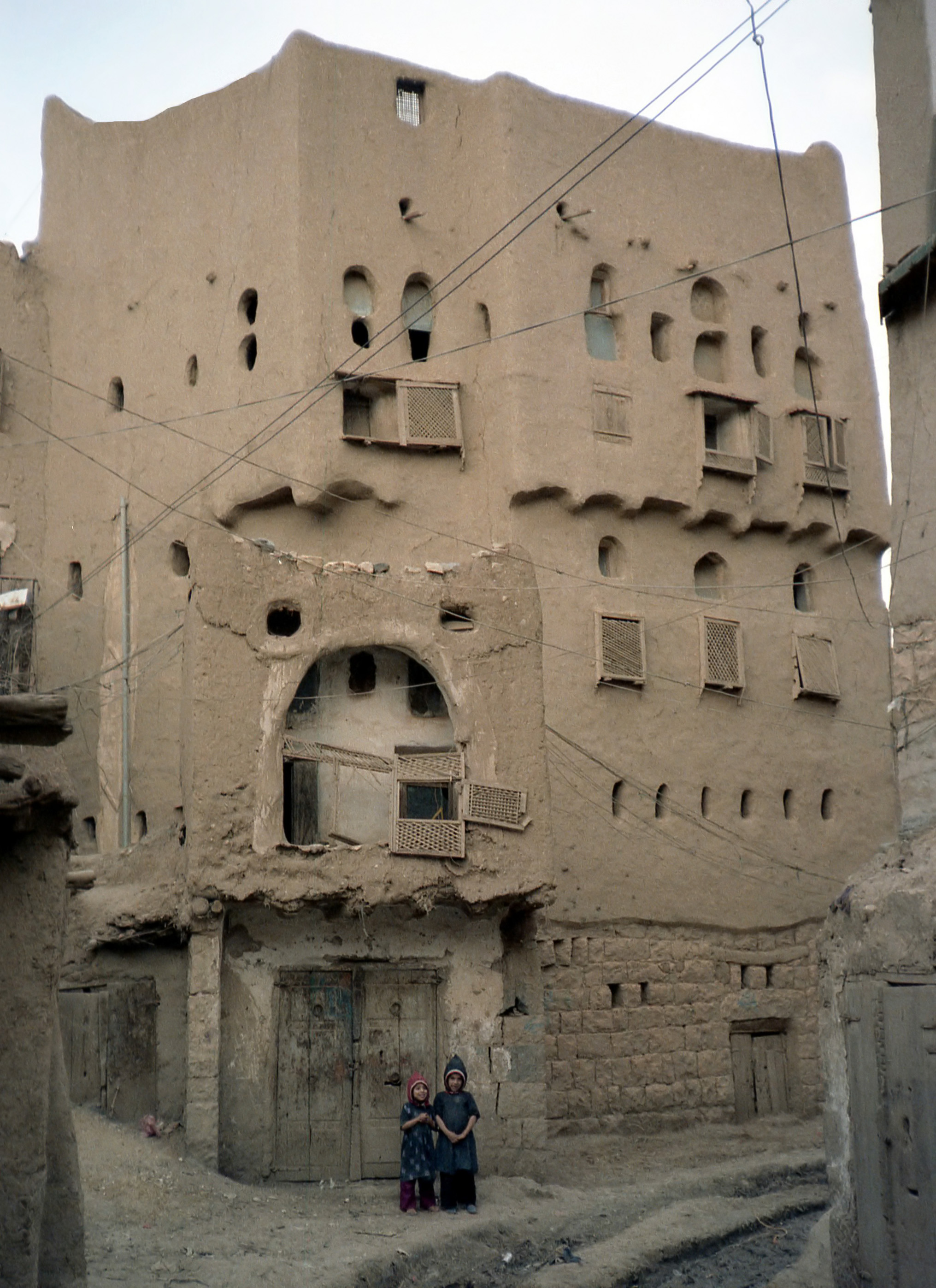
Traditional mud-built house.

'Amran has a long history, dating to the pre-Islamic era. During that period, it was one of the main centers of the Bakil tribal confederation. At the time of the Sabaean kingdom, the town blossomed into a fortress. A series of bronze plaques from that time were found in the town in the mid-nineteenth century and are now in the British Museum. In the seventh century, the town witnessed clashes against the Sabeans. Remains of carved stones that belonged to former temples and palaces bear witness to past glory. A large stone inscription is found on the western city gate (Bab al-Kabir).

'Amran is largely absent from medieval sources, and the nearby fortified town of al-Jannat eclipsed it in importance during this period. This may have been partly because 'Amran, located in the middle of the al-Bawn plain, was less defensible, whereas al-Jannat had a more strategic location. The 10th-century writer al-Hamdani described the ancient palace at 'Amran, but he gives no details about its population or any indication that it was still occupied.

From the late 14th century onward, 'Amran appears to have emerged as a strategic site, and it appears frequently in historical texts such as the Ghayat al-Amani of Yahya ibn al-Husayn during this period. Then, in the 1500s and 1600s, 'Amran is mentioned as a more generally important city.

ʿAmran is completely surrounded by walls which date to 1720. The surrounding landscape is dominated by terraced landscapes with stone walls to counteract erosion of fertile arable land. The old souq is noted for its stone columns.

== Economic development ==
The road through the city from Sana'a was modernized following Chinese investment, and is over 200 km (120 mi) long. The old medical centre has been transformed into a small public hospital. The city is located in a fertile area in what was the centre of the area's coffee industry.
