= Amran Tablets =

Archaeological artifacts

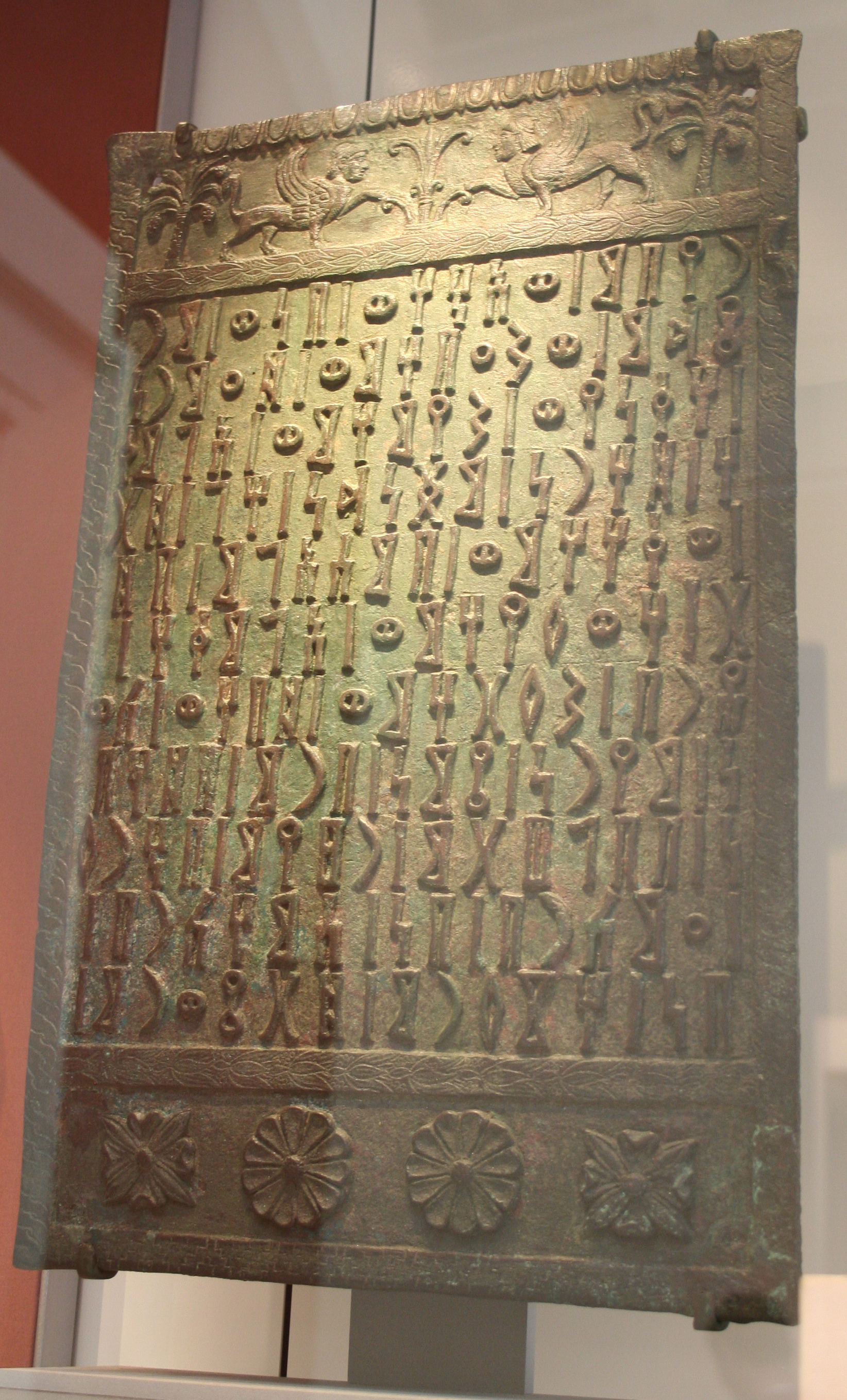
- One of the Amran Tablets on display in the British Museum
- Material: Bronze
- Size: 45 centimetres (18 in) high and 27.5 centimetres (10.8 in) wide
- Created: 1st Century BC
- Present location: British Museum, London
- Identification: ME E48456

The Amran Tablets or ʿAmrān Tablets are a series of ancient bronze plaques written in the Sabaean language found in the town of 'Amran, Yemen. Now part of the British Museum's ancient Middle Eastern collection, they form an important corpus of information on religious and military practices in South Arabia between the 1st Century BC and 3rd Century AD.

== Discovery ==
The Amran Tablets seem to have been discovered in the mid nineteenth century during the construction of a house in the town of ʿAmrān, which lies just to the north of the city of Sana'a in Yemen. 28 different panels were unearthed at the time (although more may have been melted down and destroyed) which were subsequently presented to the British Museum in 1862 by Brigadier-Colonel William Coghlan and Captain Robert Playfair of the Royal Artillery regiment. Coghlan had been appointed Political Resident and Commandment in Aden in 1854, 15 years after the Colony of Aden had become part of the British Empire.

== Description ==
All the plaques were cast in bronze through the lost-wax casting process and inscribed in the Sabaean script. They probably would have been attached to the walls of a temple as votive offerings to the gods. In the panel illustrated on this page, the inscription identifies the god Almaqah, who was the principle deity in the kingdom of Saba. The tablet records that it was dedicated in the name of Riyan and his brothers, the grandsons of Marthad from the tribe of Dhu Amran. The top of the plaque shows a pair of sphinxes flanking a lotus blossom and framed by two date palms. At the bottom of the plaque are floral patterns including two rosettes. Other plaques in the series highlight the uneasy relationship between the rival kingdoms of Saba and the Arabs of the Jawf. The text of the panels refers to a number of military conflicts and battles that raged between them, which were often about controlling the trade of frankincense and myrrh, two aromatic products exclusive to the region of South Arabia that generated considerable wealth for the local population.
