= East India House Inscription =

Foundation tablet from ancient Babylon

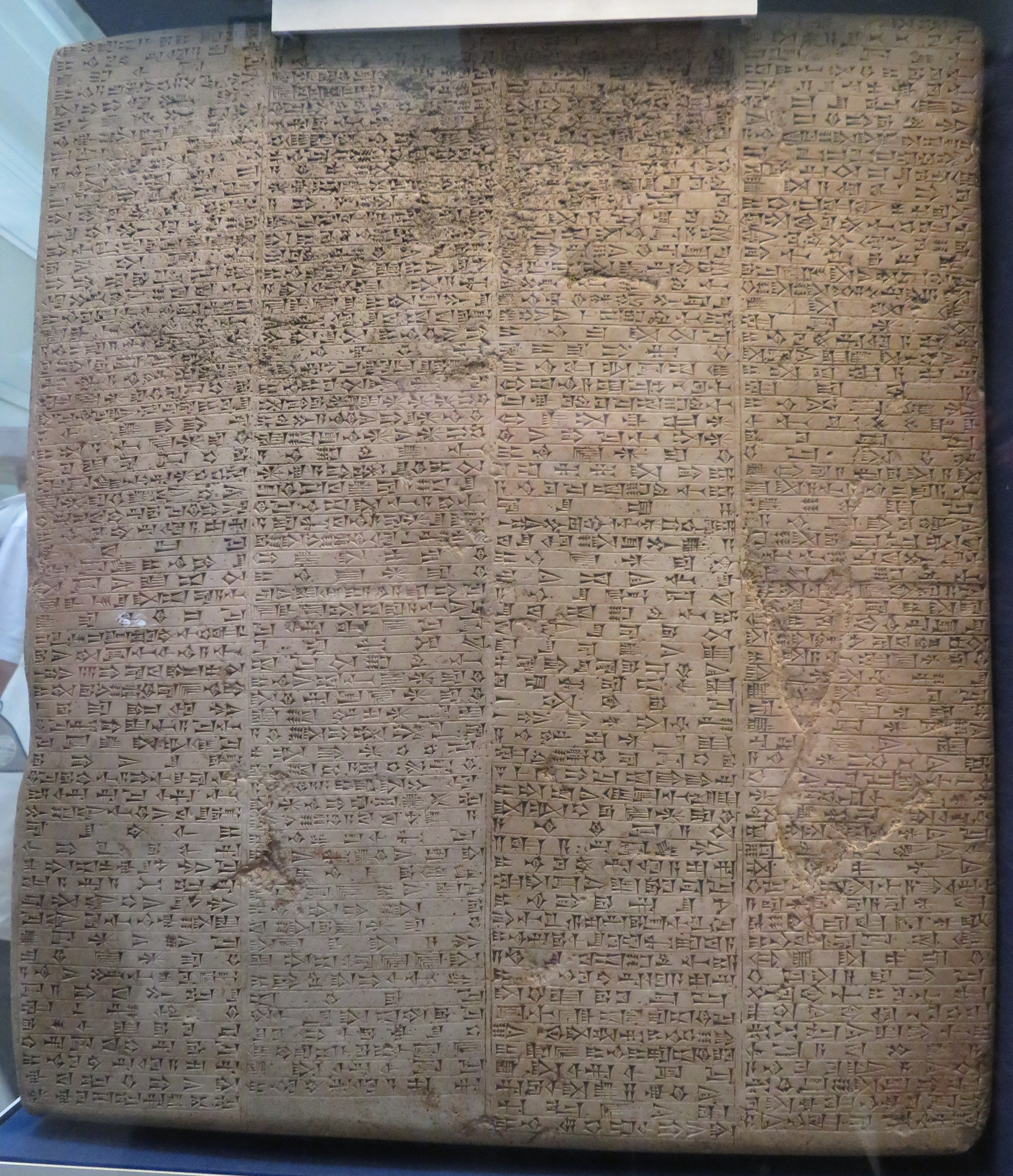
- East India House Inscription
- Material: Limestone
- Size: 56 cm by 50 cm
- Created: 604-562 BC
- Present location: British Museum, London
- Registration: 1938,0520.1

The East India House Inscription is an important foundation tablet from ancient Babylon. Since 1938, it has been a major artifact in the British Museum's Middle East collection.

== Description ==
Royal inscriptions like the East India House Inscription were intended for public display or burial in the foundations of buildings. Unlike most cuneiform writing that was made in clay, foundation tablets like this were carved in stone and were more carefully articulated, the scribes clearly taking pride in the beauty and clarity of their engraving. This text was probably originally buried in the foundations of one of King Nebuchadnezzar's numerous constructions in Babylon between 604 and 562 BC. The dimensions of the tablet measure 56.5 cm by 50.2 cm, with a thickness of 9.52 cm.

== History of the Find ==
The tablet was unearthed before 1803 in the ruins of Babylon by Sir Harford Jones Brydges, then British Resident in Baghdad. Later, Brydges presented it to the museum of East India House. It has since been known as the East India House Inscription. The tablet was eventually donated to the British Museum when the collections of East India House museum were dispersed.

== Inscription ==
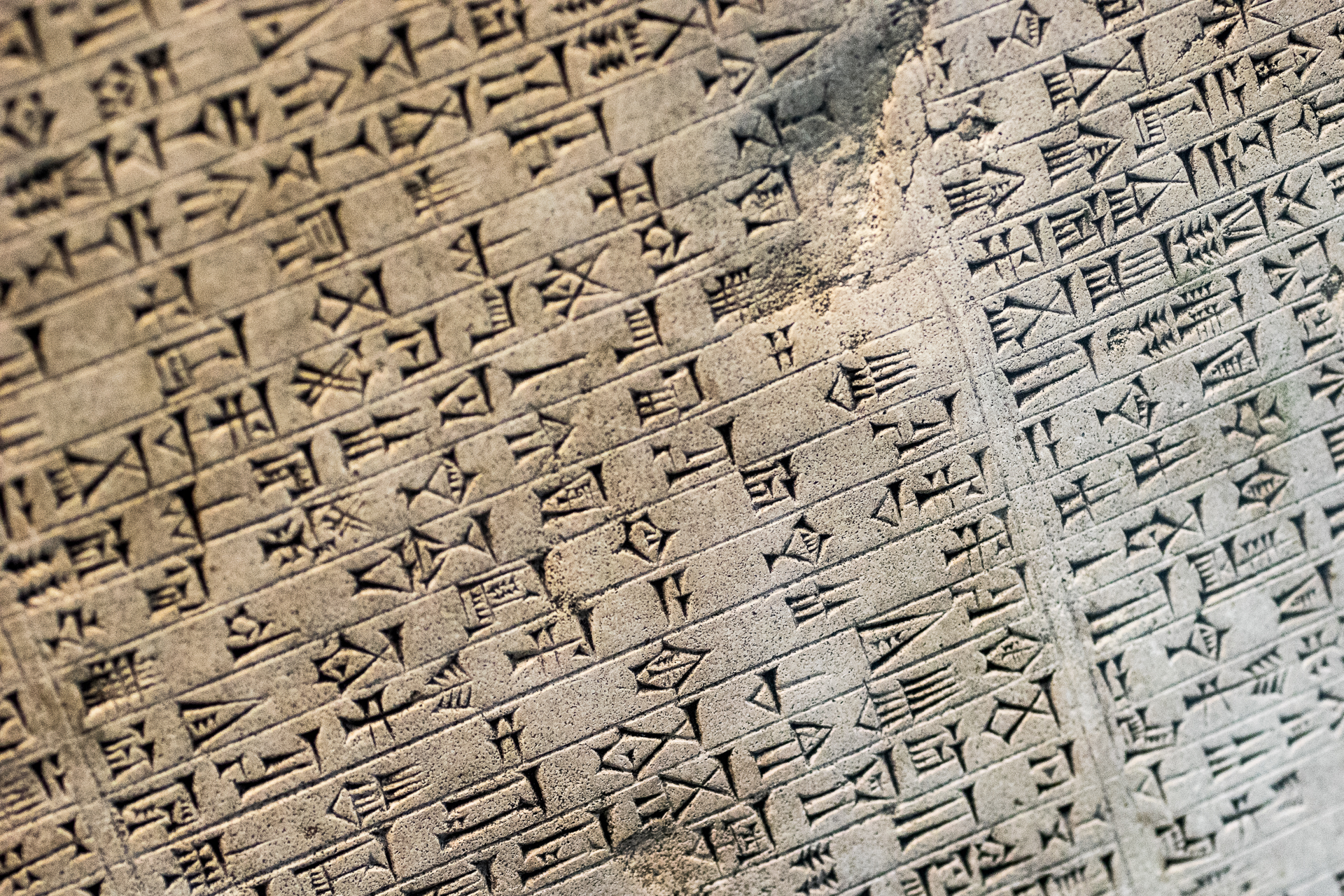
Detail of the Inscription

A translation of the first section of the inscription is described below:

"I am Nebuchadnezzar, king of Babylon, the exalted prince, the favourite of the god Marduk, the beloved of the god Nabu, the arbiter, the possessor of wisdom, who reverences their lordship, the untiring governor who is constantly anxious for the maintenance of the shrines of Babylonia and Borsippa, the wise, the pious, the son of Nabopolasser, king of Babylon; To Marduk, my lord I make supplication; Oh eternal prince, lord of all being, guide in a straight path the king whom thou lovest and whose name thou hast proclaimed as was pleasing to thee. I am the prince, the favourite, the creature of thy hand. Thou hast created me and entrusted me with dominion over all people. According to thy favour lord, which thou dost bestow on all people, cause me to love thy exalted lordship. Create in my heart, the worship of your divinity, and grant whatever is pleasing to thee because thou hast my life; By thy command, merciful Marduk, may the temple I have built endure for all time and may I be satisfied with its splendour; in its midst may I attain old age, may I be sated with offspring; therein may I receive the heavy tribute of all mankind; from the horizon of heaven to the zenith, may I have no enemies; may my descendants live therein forever and rule over the people."
