= Margaret Munn-Rankin =

British archaeologist and historian

- Born: Joan Margaret Munn-Rankin; 29 July 1913
- Died: 28 July 1981 (aged 67)

Academic work
- Discipline: Archaeology and history
- Sub-discipline: Ancient Near East; Assyriology
- Institutions: Newnham College, Cambridge; University of Cambridge

Joan Margaret Munn-Rankin (29 July 1913 – 28 July 1981), known as Margaret Munn-Rankin and published as J. M. Munn-Rankin, was a British archaeologist, historian, and academic, who specialised in the ancient Near East.

== Career ==
From 1949 until her death in 1981, she was a Fellow of Newnham College, Cambridge, and a lecturer in the Faculty of Oriental Studies, University of Cambridge. She bequeathed a sum of money to the university to establish the Margaret Munn-Rankin Studentship for Assyriology.

In addition to her extensive teaching, she was also a field archaeologist and was involved in a number of excavations including Nimrud and Tell Rifaat.

== Selected works ==
- Munn-Rankin, J. M. (1956). "Diplomacy in Western Asia in the Early Second Millennium B.C.". Iraq. 18 (1): 68–110. doi:10.2307/4199599. JSTOR 4199599.
- Munn-Rankin, J. M. (1959). "Ancient near Eastern Seals in the Fitzwilliam Museum, Cambridge". Iraq. 21 (1): 20–37. doi:10.2307/4199645. JSTOR 4199645.
- J. M. Munn-Rankin (1975). "XXV: Assyrian Military Power, 1300–1200 BC". In I. E. S. Edwards; C. J. Gadd; N. G. L. Hammond; S. Solberger (eds.). The Cambridge Ancient History, Volume II, Part 2, History of the Middle East and the Aegean Region, 1380–1000 BC. Cambridge University Press. pp. 274–306. ISBN 978-0521086912.
