= Ram in a Thicket =

Sculptures excavated at Ur, in southern Iraq

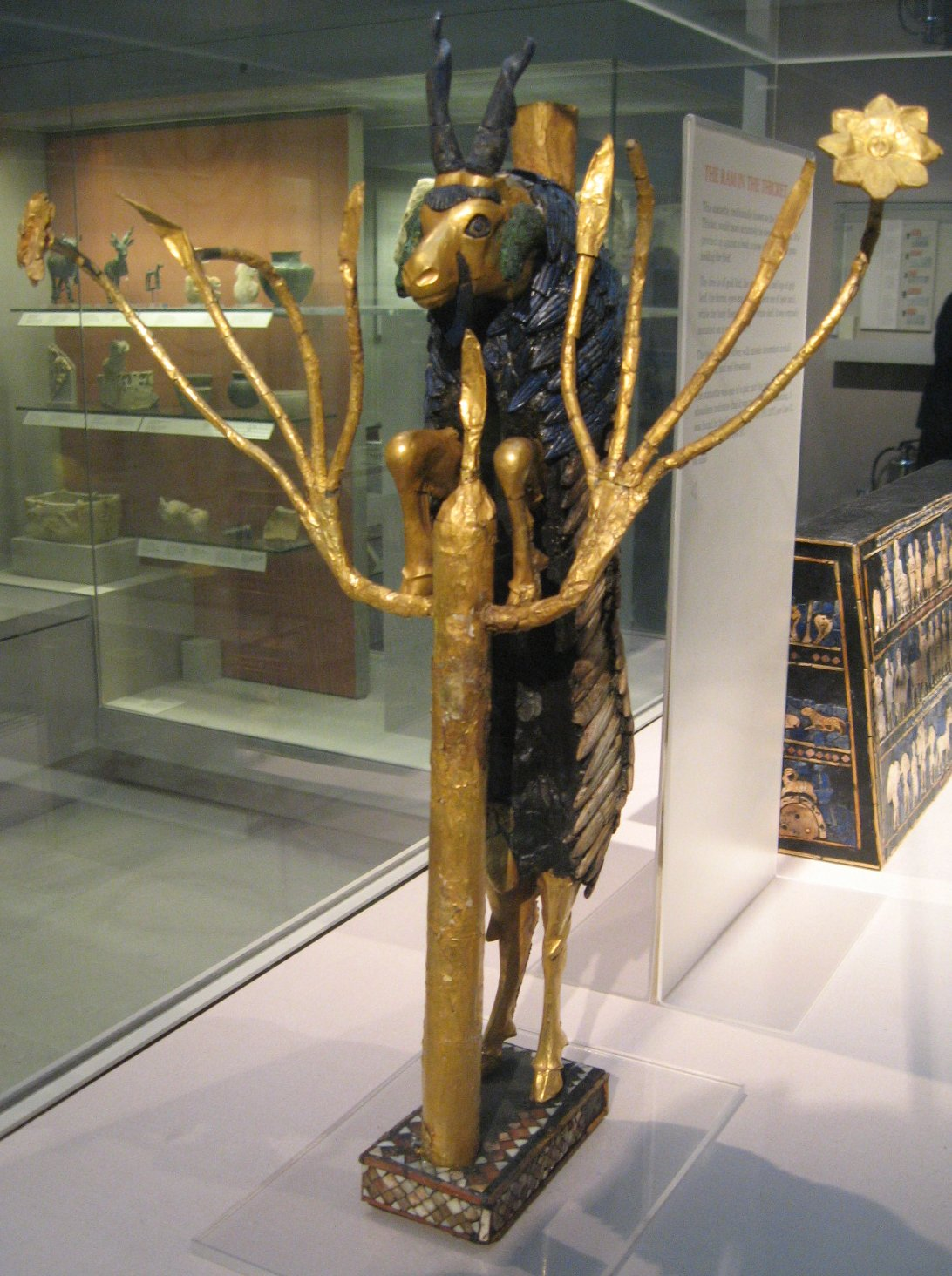
- Ram in a Thicket as displayed in the British Museum
- Material: Gold, copper, shell, limestone, lapis lazuli
- Size: 45.7 cm (18.0 in) high, 30.5 cm (12.0 in) wide
- Created: 2600–2400 BC
- Discovered: 1928–29; Ur, Ottoman Iraq; 30°57′41″N 46°06′22″E
- Discovered by: Leonard Woolley
- Present location: British Museum, London
- Registration: ME 122200

The Ram in a Thicket is a pair of figures excavated at Ur (in modern southern Iraq), which date from about 2600–2400 BC. One is in the Mesopotamia Gallery in Room 56 of the British Museum in London; the other is in the University of Pennsylvania Museum in Philadelphia, United States.

== Discovery ==
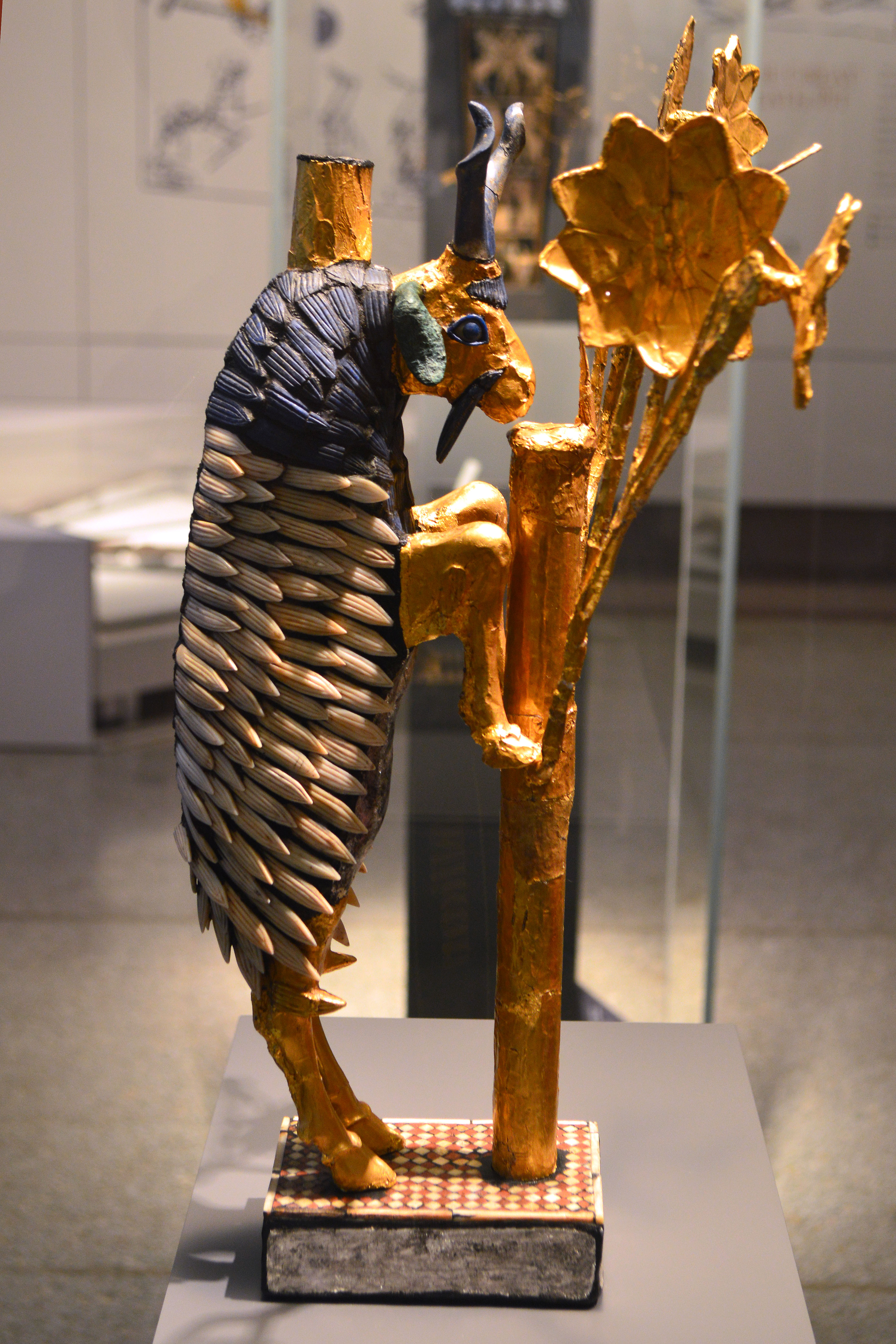
The Ram in a Thicket viewed from the side - University of Pennsylvania Version

The pair of rams would more correctly be described as goats, and were discovered lying close together in the 'Great Death Pit' (PG 1237), one of the graves in the Royal Cemetery at Ur, by archaeologist Leonard Woolley during the 1928–29 season. Woolley was in charge of the joint venture between the British Museum and the University of Pennsylvania, which began in 1922. The figure's partner is in the University of Pennsylvania Museum of Archaeology and Anthropology in Philadelphia.

Woolley named the figure the 'Ram in a Thicket' after the story of the binding of Isaac in Genesis 22.13, in which God orders Abraham to sacrifice his son Isaac, but at the last moment an angel stops Abraham and reveals a ram caught in a thicket by its horns, which Abraham sacrifices instead.

== The figure ==
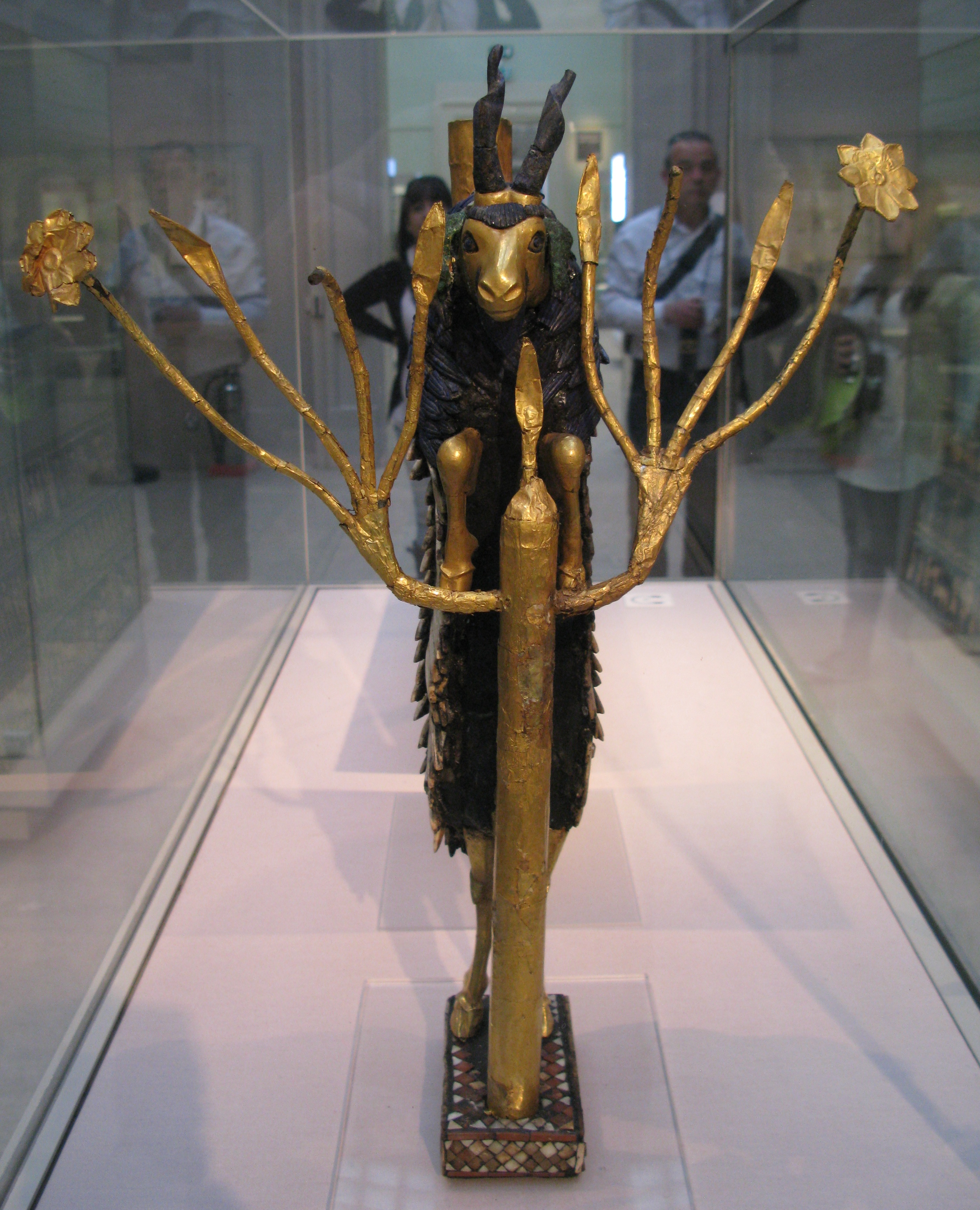
The Ram in a Thicket (London) viewed from the front

When it was discovered, the 45.7 cm (18.0 in) figure had been crushed flat by the weight of the soil above it and its inner wooden core had decomposed. This wooden core had been finely cut for the face and legs, but the body had been more roughly modelled. Woolley used wax to keep the pieces together as it was excavated, and the figure was gently pressed back into its original shape. The ram's head and legs are layered in gold leaf which had been hammered against the wood and stuck to it with a thin wash of bitumen, while its ears are copper which are now green with verdigris. The horns and the fleece on its shoulders are of lapis lazuli, and the body's fleece is made of shell, attached to a thicker coat of bitumen. The figure's genitals are gold, while its belly was silver plate, now oxidised beyond restoration. The other figure's genitals are presumed silver, corroded, and therefore missing. The tree is also covered in gold leaf with gold flowers.

The figure stands on a small rectangular base decorated with a mosaic of shell, red limestone and lapis lazuli. The figure was originally attached to the flowering shrub by silver chains around its fetlocks, but these chains have completely corroded away. It is thought that the two figures originally faced each other as confronted animals, and that the tubes going up from their shoulders were used to support something, probably a bowl or similar object.

=== Woolley's description ===
"Gaiety of another kind enters into the polychrome—one might almost say chryselephantine—figure of a goat which we have called for obvious reasons 'the ram caught in a thicket'. The head and legs of the animal are of gold, the belly of silver, the body-fleece of pieces of carved shell but the fleece on the shoulders of lapis lazuli, and of lapus lazuli are the eye-pupils, the horns and the beard; the tree to whose branches its front legs were chained is of gold and it stands on a pedestal whose sides were silver-plated and its top of pink and white mosaic (PL 36)... The elegance and lightness of the figure harmonise perfectly with the brilliance of its colour—there is all the agility of the goat translated into art, but at the same time it is a dedicated animal and possesses a curious solemnity; the momentary poise which, as the drawings on the shell plaques prove, the artist knew so well how to seize is here frozen into permanence and life has become statuesque."
