= Amran district =

Coordinates: 15°45′N 43°55′E

Amran District مديرية عمران
- District
- Interactive map of Amran District
- Country: Yemen
- Governorate: 'Amran

Population (2003)
  - Total: 96,375
- Time zone: UTC+3 (Yemen Standard Time)

Amran District (Arabic: مديرية عمران) is a district of the 'Amran Governorate, Yemen. As of 2003, the district had a population of 96,375 inhabitants. The capital lies at `Amran.
