= Warrior relief of Efrenk =

Greco-Roman rock relief in Cilicia, Turkey

Coordinates: 36°36′28″N 34°04′31.4″E

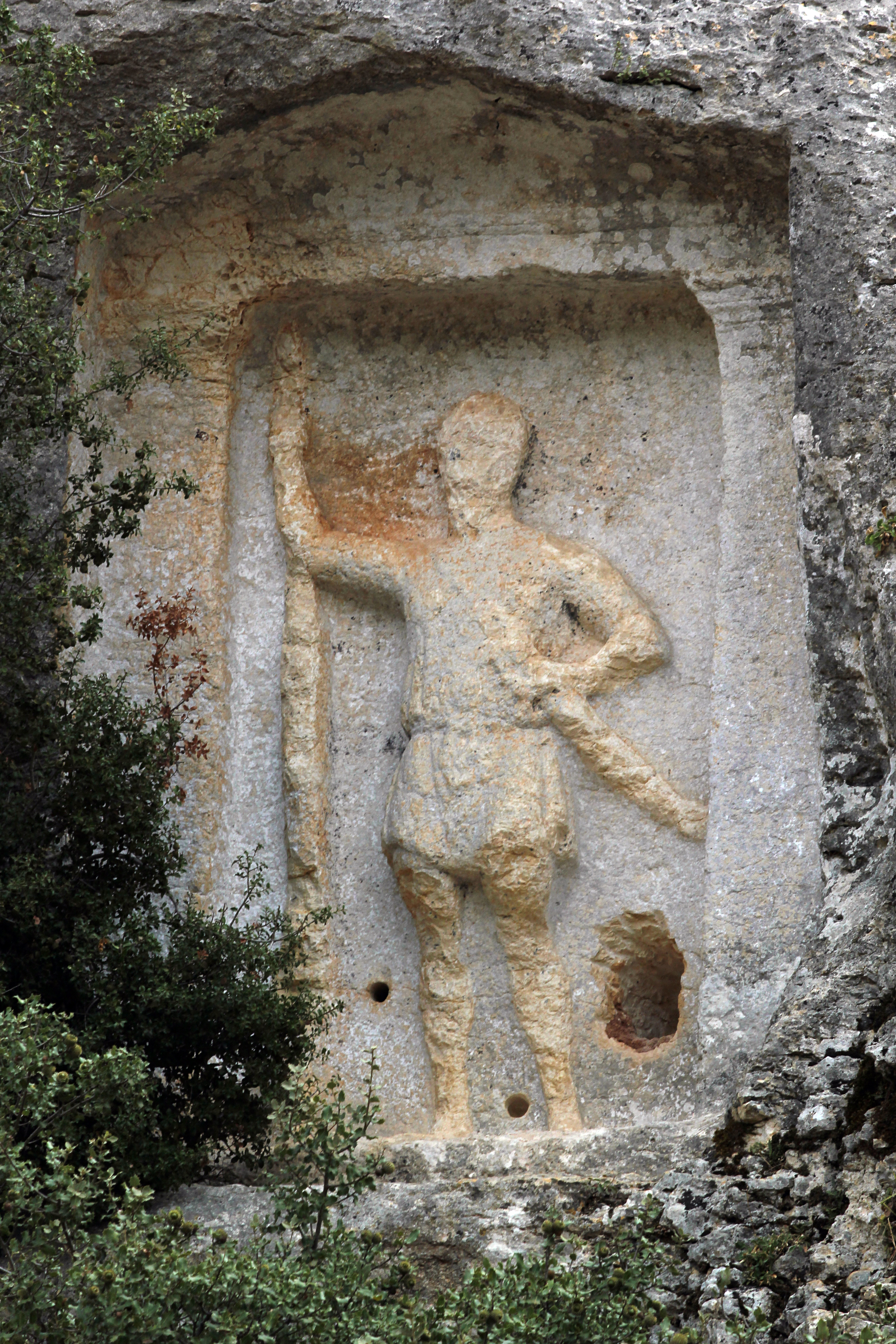
- Created: 2nd century AD
- Present location: Mersin Province, Turkey

The Warrior relief of Efrenk is a rock relief from the Greco-Roman period, probably the 2nd century AD, located by the Lamos river (modern day Limonlu) in Cilicia, southern Turkey.

== Location ==
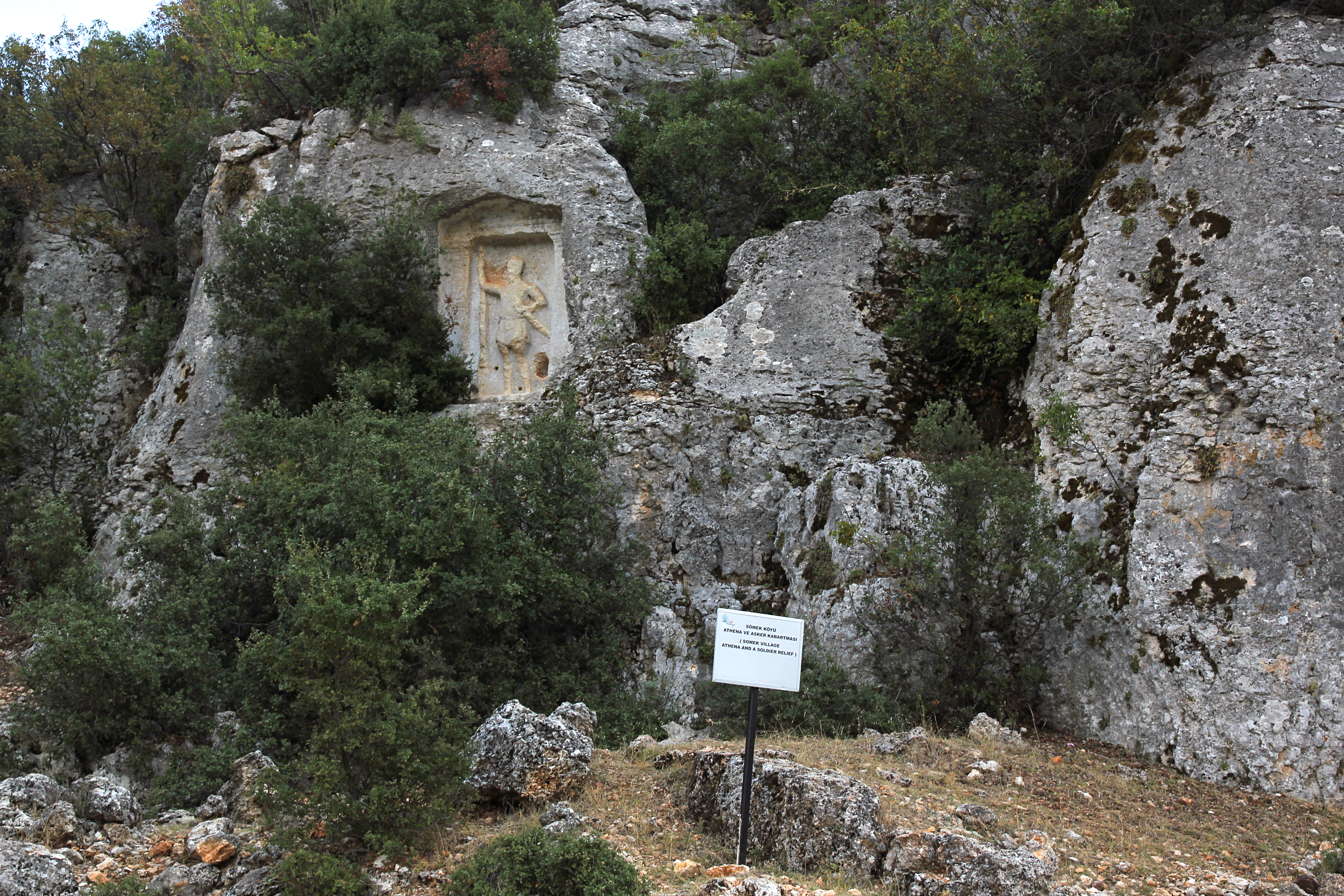
Setting of the relief

The relief is about two kilometres north of Sömek in the Silifke district of Mersin Province, about 30 km northeast of the city of Silifke and 20 km north of Kızkalesi, the ancient Korykos. It is carved into a northwest-facing cliff-face beside a steep path leading down to the Lamos. A ford at this spot connected the ancient settlement of Efrenk on the hill south of the relief with Veyselli on the other side of the Lamos. The route continued on to the settlement at the mouth of the Lamos, Antiochia Lamotis (now Limonlu). After passing the relief, the route led south past Sömek towards Canbazlı and Olba, as well as Korykos and Elaiussa Sebaste on the Mediterranean coast. The river Lamos is often treated as the border between the ancient regions of Rough Cilicia (Kilikia Tracheia) in the west and Flat Cilicia (Kilikia Pedias) in the east.

The Athena relief of Sömek is roughly 600 m to the southeast.

== Description ==
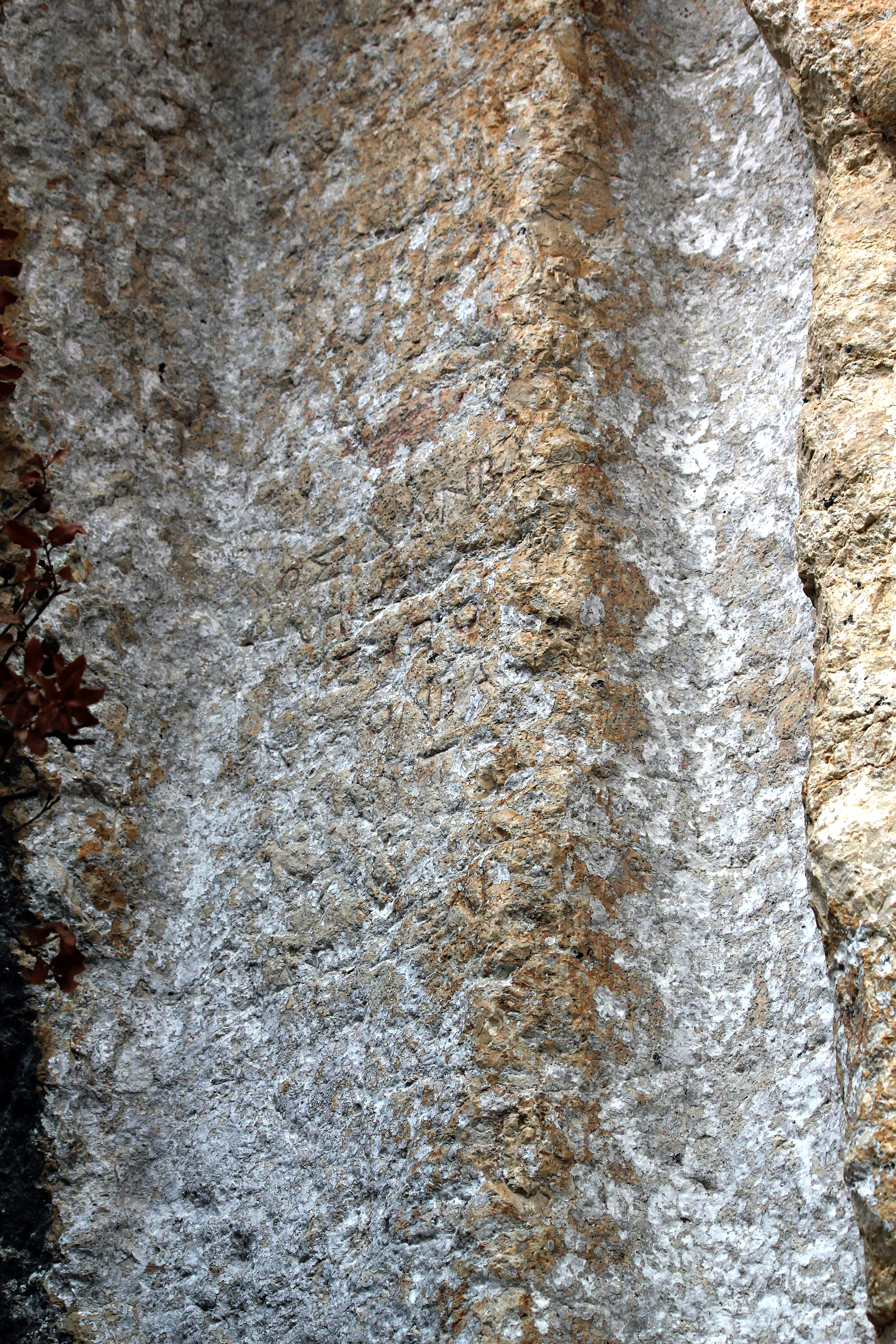
inscription

The relief is carved into a vertical cliff-face about 5 m above street level. It is 1.9 m high and depicts a warrior, surrounded by a naiskos. The legs are badly damaged; the right leg supports his weight, while the left leg hangs free. His raised right arm holds up a spear. On his left side he wears a sword, with his left hand on the grip. He is dressed in a short, belted chiton, with clearly carved drapery. There are traces of white paint on the relief in several spaces - between the head and the right arm, for instance, there are traces of red paint. Paint very rarely survives on Cilician cliff reliefs.

On the left pilaster there is an inscription at about chest height, which has been resolved as an 8 line inscription:

῾Ός δ’ ἂν βά-
λη ἤ ἀ[φ]αι-
ρήση τὸ [ἡ-]
ρῶιον, βά-
λοι αύτ[ον]
ὁ ῾Ήλιος
καὶ ἡ Σελή-
ν[η].

Translation:

May Helios and Selene attack anyone who attacks or diminishes the Heroon.

Josef Keil and Adolf Wilhelm report the illegible traces of an "actual funerary inscription in the background on the left and right sides of the figure's head." The letter forms date the inscription to the middle of the Imperial period, while similarities in posture and clothing led Serra Durugönül to date the relief to the second century AD when she studied the Cilician cliff reliefs in the 1980s.

== Research history ==
The first short description (with an incomplete reading of the inscription) was published by Edward L. Hicks in 1891 in his Inscriptions from Western Cilicia. The ancient historians Keil and Wilhelm travelled Cilicia in 1891 and 1925, publishing an account in 1931, Denkmäler aus dem Rauhen Kilikien (Monuments of Rough Cilicia), in which the relief of Efrenk is described with a fuller reading of the inscription. In 1989 Serra Durugönül completed a dissertation, Die Felsreliefs im Rauhen Kilikien (The Cliff-reliefs of Rough Cilicia), which also discusses the warrior relief.

== See also ==
- Athena relief of Sömek – another Greco-Roman relief, located approximately 600 meters to the southeast

== Bibliography ==
- Edward L. Hicks. "Inscriptions from Western Cilicia." The Journal of Hellenic Studies 12, 1891, p. 260, no. 36.
- Josef Keil, Adolf Wilhelm. Denkmäler aus dem Rauhen Kilikien. (= Monumenta Asiae minoris antiqua Vol. 3). London 1931, p. 98 Inscr. 111.
- Serra Durugönül. Die Felsreliefs im Rauhen Kilikien. (= BAR International Series. 511). BAR, Oxford 1989, pp. 47–48, 103, 150 und passim.
