= Shikaft-e Gulgul =

Registered in the List of National Monuments of Iran

Coordinates: 33°29′28″N 47°27′40″E

Shikaft-e Golgol-Gulgul (or Gulgulcave or Golgolcave) site is an Assyrian rock relief and inscription located in the vicinity of Gulgul, گل گل a village near Mount Pushta-e Kuh at Ilam in Iran.

It is oblong shaped with 130X90 centimeters dimensions. Its height from the ground stands at 270 centimeters. On the inscription there is an engraving of an Assyrian soldier with a helmet, holding an arrow, with a moon and a star above his head and on the lower section of this inscription, several sentences in cuneiform language have been engraved which were translated by Mr. Vandenberg in 1973 AD. These sentences refer to the conquest of Elam and Lorestan by the Assyrians.

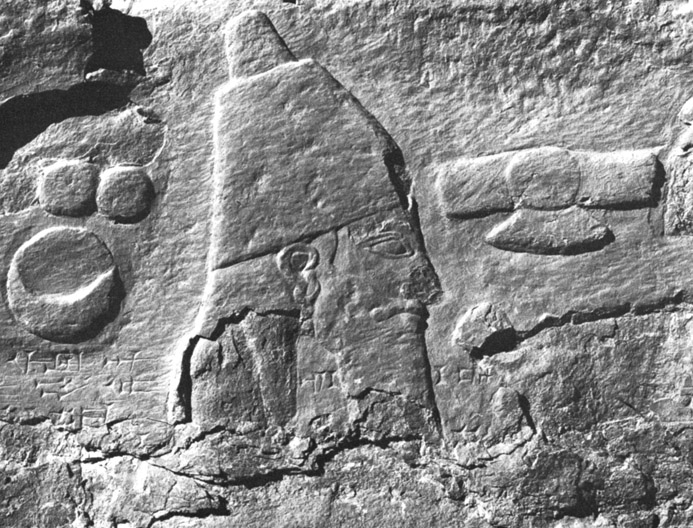
Shikaft-i Gulgul, Ilam, Iran

== See also ==
- Bit-Istar
- Tang-i Var
