= Rock relief =

Relief sculpture carved into solid rock

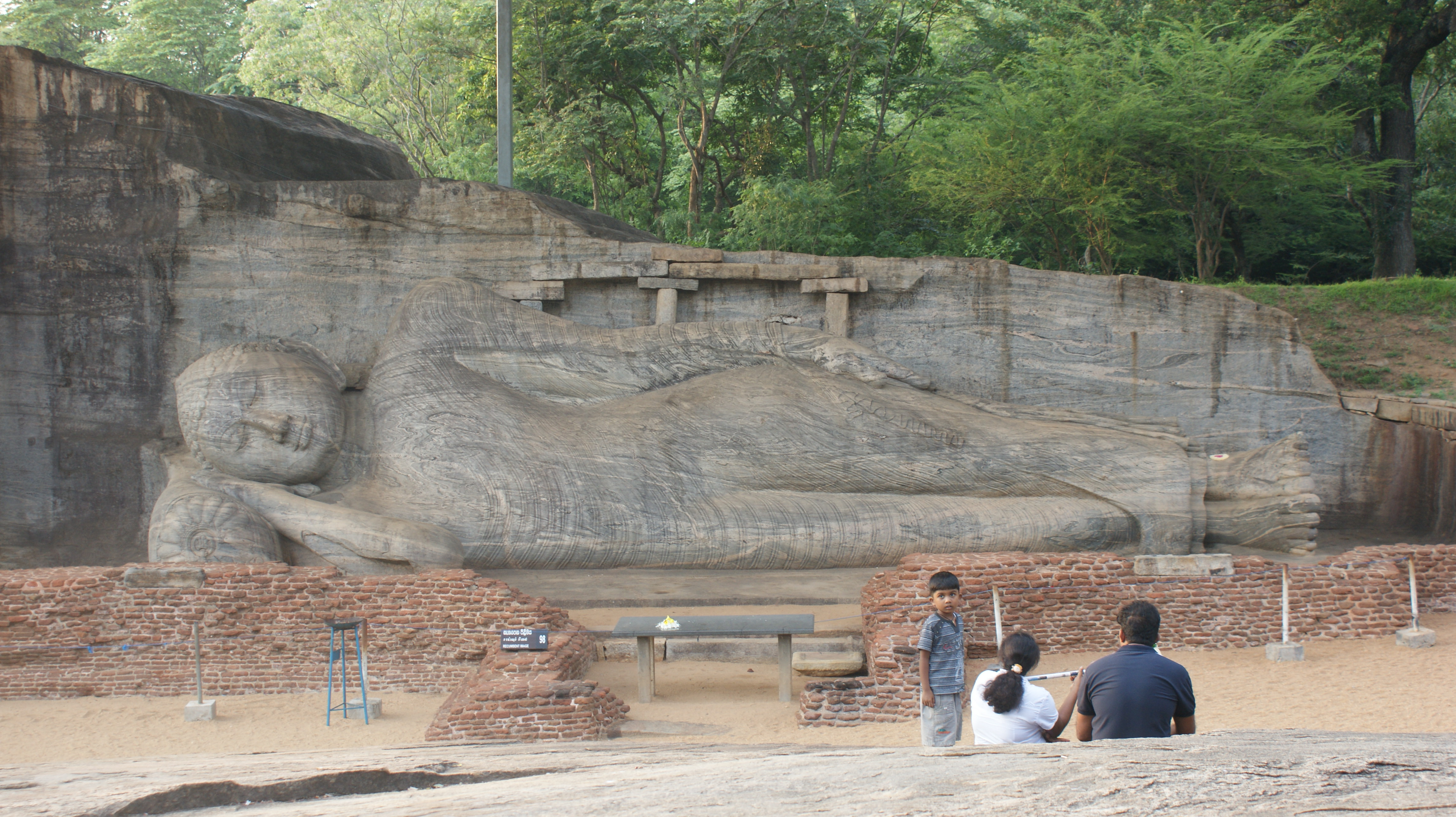
Reclining Buddha at Gal Vihara, Sri Lanka. The remains of the image house that originally enclosed it can be seen.

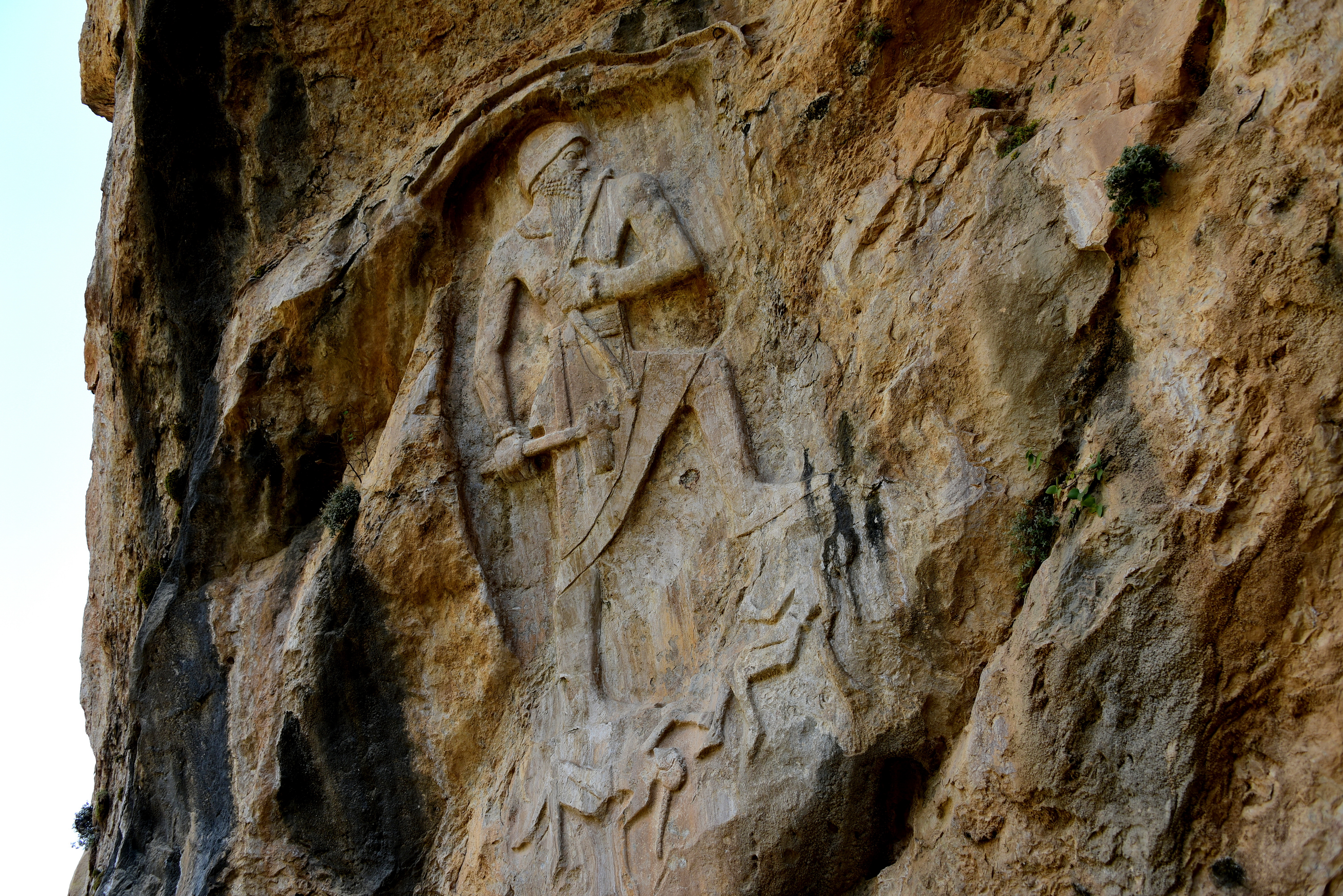
Naram-Sin of Akkad, reigned from c. 2254 BC, Qaradagh Mountain, Sulaymaniyah, Iraq

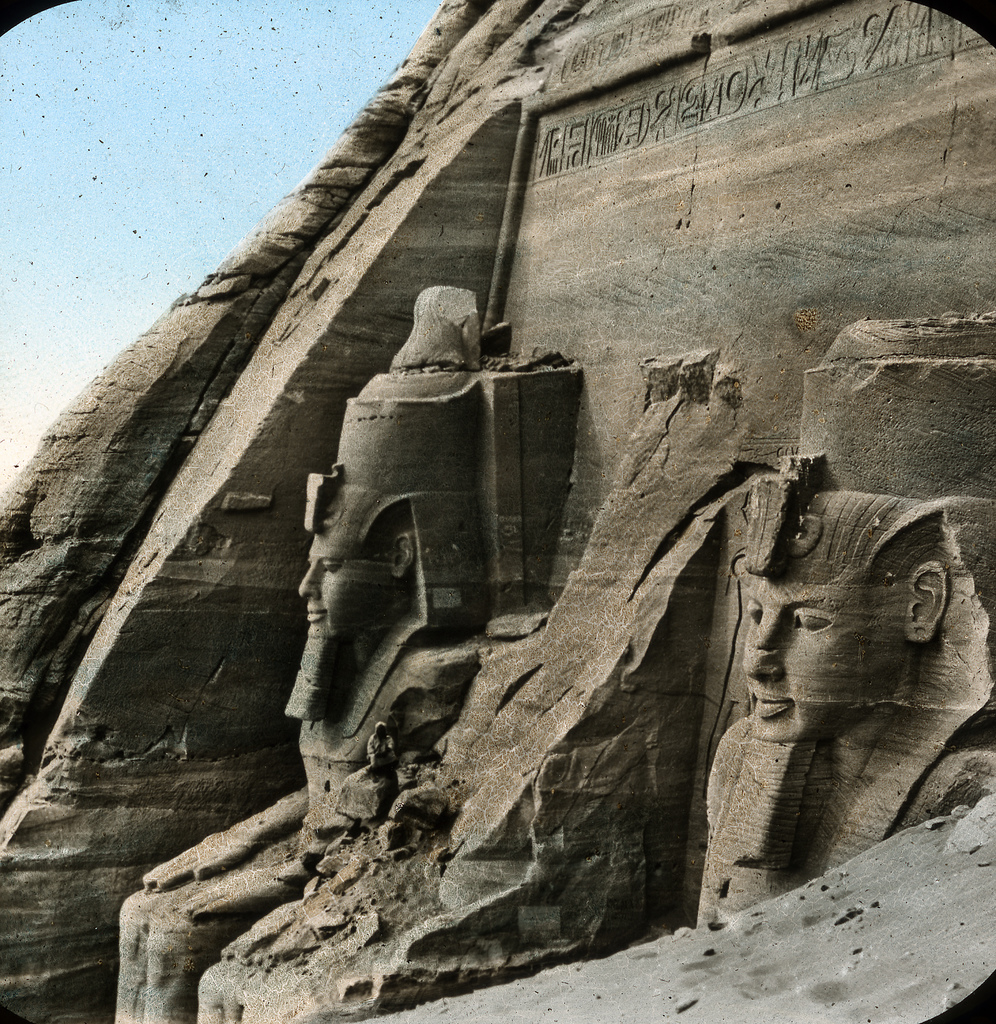
Two of the reliefs at the Abu Simbel temples, before relocation

A rock relief or rock-cut relief is a relief sculpture carved on solid or "living rock" such as a cliff, rather than a detached piece of stone. They are a category of rock art, and sometimes found as part of, or in conjunction with, rock-cut architecture. However, they tend to be omitted in most works on rock art, which concentrate on engravings and paintings by prehistoric peoples. A few such works exploit the natural contours of the rock and use them to define an image, but they do not amount to man-made reliefs. Rock reliefs have been made in many cultures throughout human history, and were especially important in the art of the ancient Near East. Rock reliefs are generally fairly large, as they need to be in order to have an impact in the open air. Most of those discussed here have figures that are over life-size, and in many the figures are multiples of life-size.

Stylistically they normally relate to other types of sculpture from the culture and period concerned, and except for Hittite and Persian examples they are generally discussed as part of that wider subject. Reliefs on near-vertical surfaces are most common, but reliefs on essentially horizontal surfaces are also found. The term typically excludes relief carvings inside caves, whether natural or themselves man-made, which are especially found in Indian rock-cut architecture. Natural rock formations made into statues or other sculpture in the round, most famously at the Great Sphinx of Giza, are also usually excluded. Reliefs on large boulders left in their natural location, like the Hittite İmamkullu relief, are likely to be included, but smaller boulders may be called stelae or carved orthostats. Many or most ancient reliefs were probably originally painted, over a layer of plaster; in some traces of this remain.

The first requirement for a rock relief is a suitable face of stone; a near-vertical cliff minimizes the work required, otherwise a sloping rock face is often cut back to give a vertical area to carve. Most of the ancient Near East was well supplied with hills and mountains offering many cliff faces. An exception was the land of Sumer, where all stone had to be imported over considerable distances, and so the art of Mesopotamia only features rock relief around the edges of the region. The Hittites and ancient Persians were the most prolific makers of rock reliefs in the Near East.

The form is adopted by some cultures and ignored by others. In the many commemorative stelae of Nahr el-Kalb, 12 kilometres north of Beirut, successive imperial rulers have carved memorials and inscriptions. The Ancient Egyptian, Neo-Assyrian and Neo-Babylonian rulers include relief imagery in their monuments, while the Roman and Islamic rulers do not, nor more modern ones (who erect slabs of stone carved elsewhere and fitted to the rock).

== Egypt ==
Although prehistoric engraved petroglyphs are common in Egypt, in general the form is not a very common one in Ancient Egyptian art, and only possible in some parts of the country, generally those away from the main centres of population, as Abu Simbel was. There are a group of figures surrounding an image of Mentuhotep II, who died in 2010 BC and was the first pharaoh of the Middle Kingdom.

Before they were cut away and moved, the colossal figures outside the Abu Simbel temples were very high reliefs. Other sculpture outside temples cut into the rock qualifies as rock reliefs. The reliefs at Nahr el-Kalb commemorate Rameses II, and are at the furthest reach of his empire (indeed beyond the area he reliably controlled) in modern Lebanon.

== Hittites and Assyrians ==
The Hittites were important producers of rock reliefs, which form a relatively large part of the few artistic remains they have left. The Karabel relief of a king was seen by Herodotus, who mistakenly thought it showed the Egyptian Pharaoh Sesostris. This, like many Hittite reliefs, is near a road, but actually rather hard to see from the road. There are more than a dozen sites, most over 1000 metres in elevation, overlooking plains, and typically near water. These perhaps were placed with an eye to the Hittite's relation to the landscape rather than merely as rulers' propaganda, signs of "landscape control", or border markers, as has often been thought. They are often at sites with a sacred significance both before and after the Hittite period, and apparently places where the divine world was considered as sometimes breaking through to the human one.

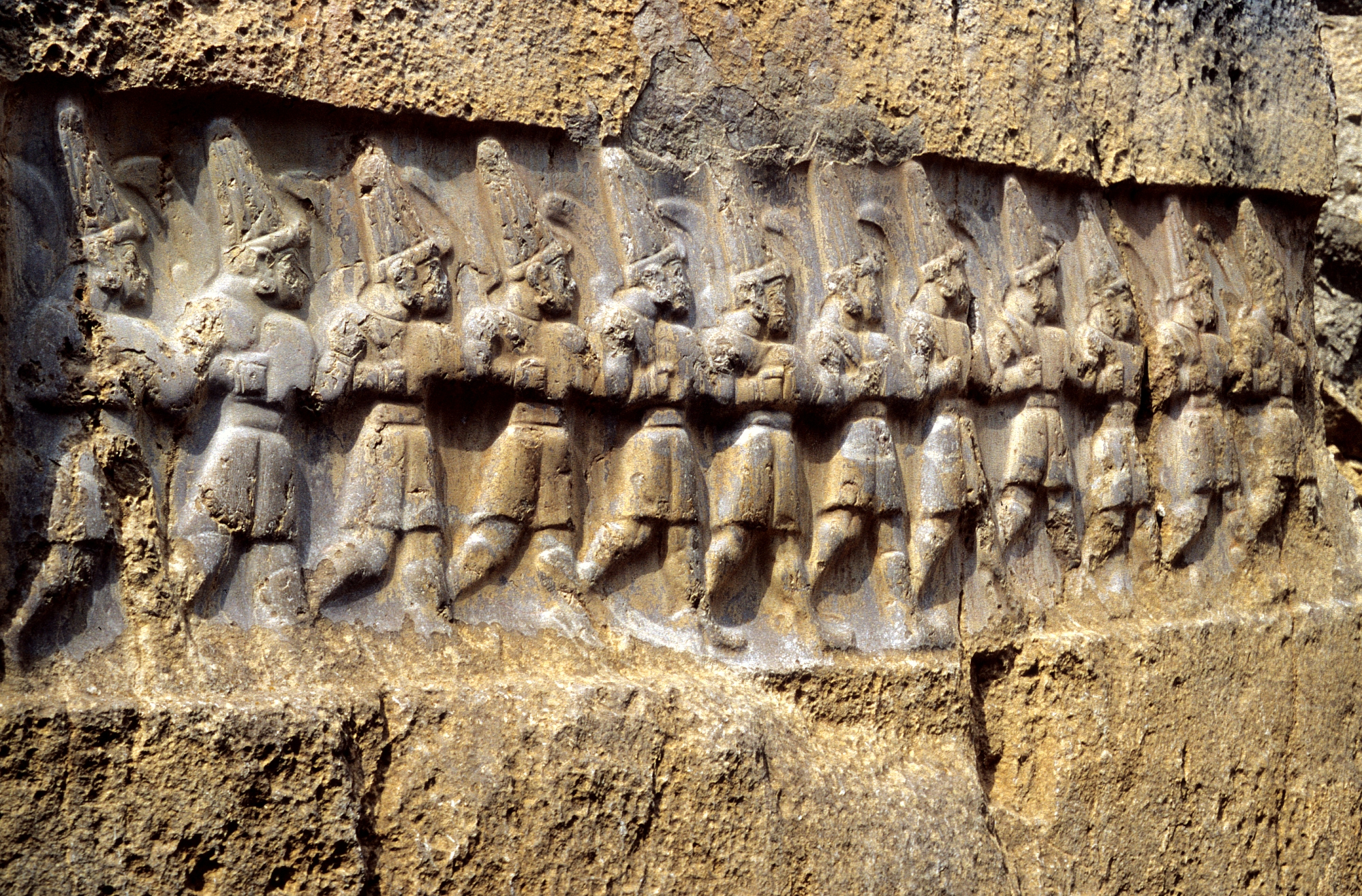
Hittite deities at Yazılıkaya

At Yazılıkaya, just outside the capital of Hattusa, a series of reliefs of Hittite gods in procession decorate open-air "chambers" made by adding barriers among the natural rock formations. The site was apparently a sanctuary, and possibly a burial site, for the commemoration of the ruling dynasty's ancestors. It was perhaps a private space for the dynasty and a small group of the elite, unlike the more public wayside reliefs. The usual form of these is to show royal males carrying weapons, usually holding a spear, carrying a bow over their shoulder, with a sword at their belt. They have attributes associated with divinity, and so are shown as "god-warriors".

The Assyrians probably took the form from the Hittites; the sites chosen for their 49 recorded reliefs often also make little sense if "signalling" to the general population was the intent, being high and remote, but often near water. The Neo-Assyrians recorded in other places, including metal reliefs on the Balawat Gates showing them being made, the carving of rock reliefs, and it has been suggested that the main intended audience was the gods, the reliefs and the inscriptions that often accompany them being almost of the nature of a "business report" submitted by the ruler. A canal system built by the Neo-Assyrian king Sennacherib (reigned 704–681 BC) to supply water to Nineveh was marked by a number of reliefs showing the king with gods. Other reliefs at the Tigris tunnel, a cave in modern Turkey believed to be the source of the river Tigris, are "almost inaccessible and invisible for humans". Probably built by Sennacherib's son Esarhaddon, Shikaft-e Gulgul is a late example in modern Iran, apparently related to a military campaign.

== Persia ==
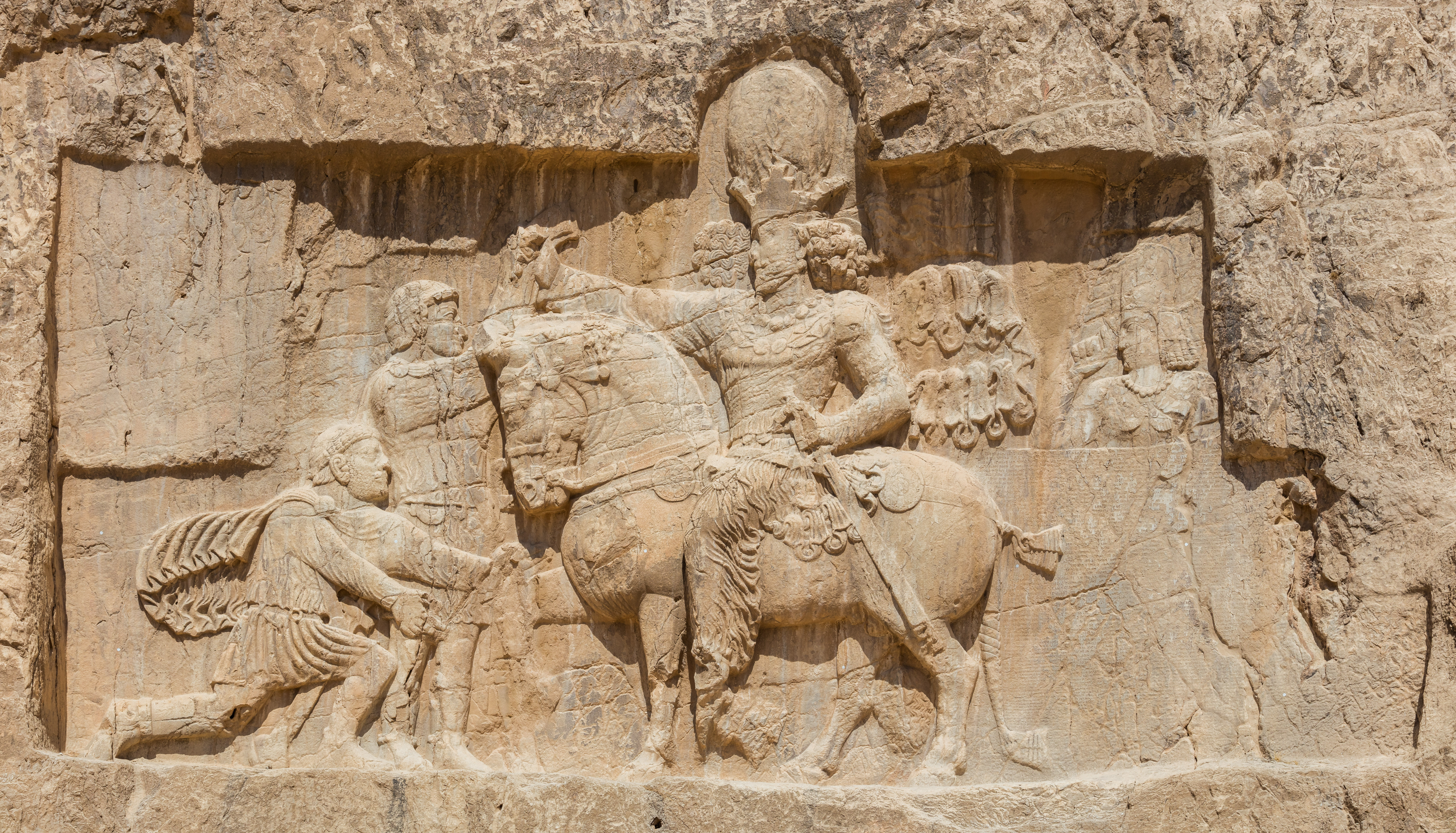
The triumph of Shapur I over the Roman Emperor Valerian, and Philip the Arab, Naqsh-e Rustam.

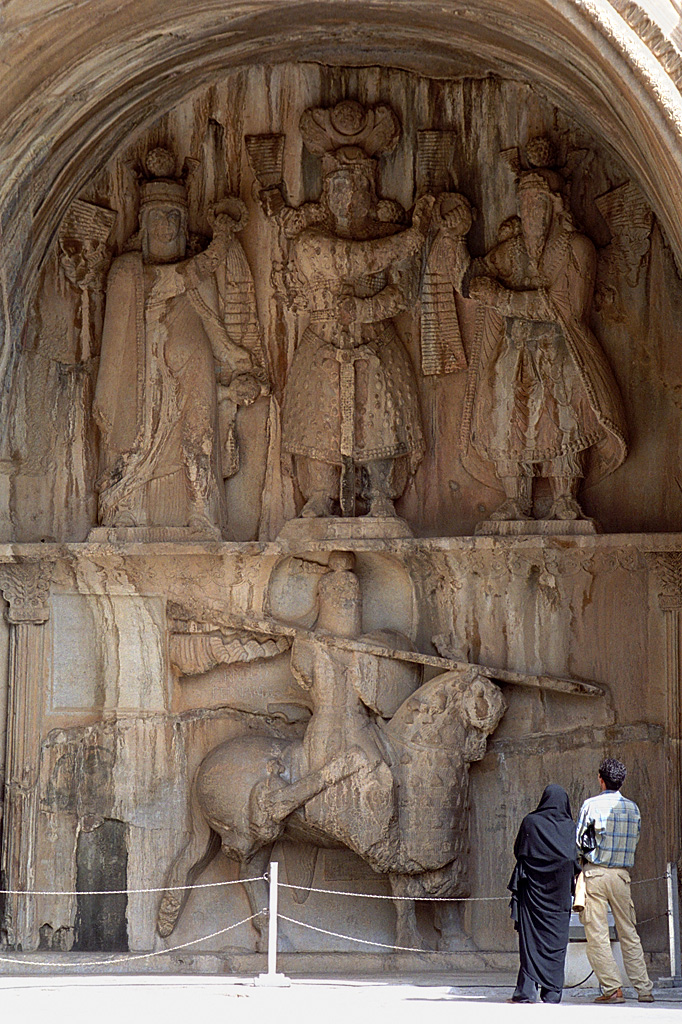
Taq Bostan; the "knight" is probably Khosrow Parviz mounted on Shabdiz

The large carved rock relief, typically placed high beside a road, and near a source of water, is a common medium in Persian art, mostly used to glorify the king and proclaim Persian control over territory. It begins with Lullubi and Elamite rock reliefs, such as those at Kul-e Farah and Eshkaft-e Salman in southwest Iran, and continues under the Assyrians. The Behistun relief and inscription, made around 500 BC for Darius the Great, is on a far grander scale, reflecting and proclaiming the power of the Achaemenid Empire. Persian rulers commonly boasted of their power and achievements, until the Muslim conquest removed imagery from such monuments; much later there was a small revival under the Qajar dynasty.

Behistun is unusual in having a large and important inscription, which like the Egyptian Rosetta Stone repeats its text in three different languages, here all using cuneiform script: Old Persian, Elamite, and Babylonian (a later form of Akkadian). This was important in the modern understanding of these languages. Other Persian reliefs generally lack inscriptions, and the kings involved often can only be tentatively identified. The problem is helped in the case of the Sassanids by their custom of showing a different style of crown for each king, which can be identified from their coins.

Naqsh-e Rustam is the necropolis of the Achaemenid dynasty (500–330 BC), with four large tombs cut high into the cliff face. These have mainly architectural decoration, but the facades include large panels over the doorways, each very similar in content, with figures of the king being invested by a god, above a zone with rows of smaller figures bearing tribute, with soldiers and officials. The three classes of figures are sharply differentiated in size. The entrance to each tomb is at the centre of each cross, which opens onto a small chamber, where the king lay in a sarcophagus. The horizontal beam of each of the tomb's facades is believed to be a replica of the entrance of the palace at Persepolis.

Only one has inscriptions and the matching of the other kings to tombs is somewhat speculative; the relief figures are not intended as individualized portraits. The third from the left, identified by an inscription, is the tomb of Darius I the Great (c. 522–486 BC). The other three are believed to be those of Xerxes I (c. 486–465 BC), Artaxerxes I (c. 465–424 BC), and Darius II (c. 423–404 BC) respectively. A fifth unfinished one might be that of Artaxerxes III, who reigned at the longest two years, but is more likely that of Darius III (c. 336–330 BC), last of the Achaemenid dynasts. The tombs were looted following the conquest of the Achaemenid Empire by Alexander the Great.

Well below the Achaemenid tombs, near ground level, are rock reliefs with large figures of Sassanian kings, some meeting gods, others in combat. The most famous shows the Sassanian king Shapur I on horseback, with the Roman Emperor Valerian bowing to him in submission, and Philip the Arab (an earlier emperor who paid Shapur tribute) holding Shapur's horse, while the dead Emperor Gordian III, killed in battle, lies beneath it (other identifications have been suggested). This commemorates the Battle of Edessa in 260 AD, when Valerian became the only Roman Emperor who was captured as a prisoner of war, a lasting humiliation for the Romans. The placing of these reliefs clearly suggests the Sassanid intention to link themselves with the glories of the earlier Achaemenid Empire. There are three further Achaemenid royal tombs with similar reliefs at Persepolis, one unfinished.

The seven Sassanian reliefs, whose approximate dates range from 225 to 310 AD, show subjects including investiture scenes and battles. The earliest relief at the site is Elamite, from about 1000 BC. About a kilometre away is Naqsh-e Rajab, with a further four Sassanid rock reliefs, three celebrating kings and one a high priest. Another important Sassanid site is Taq Bostan with several reliefs including two royal investitures and a famous figure of a cataphract or Persian heavy cavalryman, about twice life size, probably representing the king Khosrow Parviz mounted on his favourite horse Shabdiz; the pair continued to be celebrated in later Persian literature. Firuzabad, Fars and Bishapur have groups of Sassanian reliefs, the former including the oldest, a large battle scene, now badly worn. At Barm-e Delak a king offers a flower to his queen.

Sassanian reliefs are concentrated in the first 80 years of the dynasty, though one important set are 6th-century, and at relatively few sites, mostly in the Sassanid heartland. The later ones in particular suggest that they draw on a now-lost tradition of similar reliefs in palaces in stucco. The rock reliefs were probably coated in plaster and painted.

The rock reliefs of the preceding Persian Seleucids and Parthians are generally smaller and more crude, and not all direct royal commissions as the Sassanid ones clearly were. At Behistun an earlier relief including a lion was adapted into a reclining Herakles in a fully Hellenistic style; he reclines on a lion skin. This was only uncovered below rubble relatively recently; an inscription dates it to 148 BC. Other reliefs in Iran include the Assyrian king in shallow relief at Shikaft-e Gulgul; not all sites with Persian reliefs are in modern Iran. Qajar reliefs include a large and lively panel showing hunting at the royal hunting-ground of Tangeh Savashi, and a panel, still largely with its colouring intact, at Taq Bostan showing the shah seated with attendants.

The standard catalogue of pre-Islamic Persian reliefs lists the known examples (as at 1984) as follows: Lullubi #1–4; Elam #5–19; Assyrian #20–21; Achaemenid #22–30; Late/Post-Achaemenid and Seleucid #31–35; Parthian #36–49; Sasanian #50–84; others #85–88.

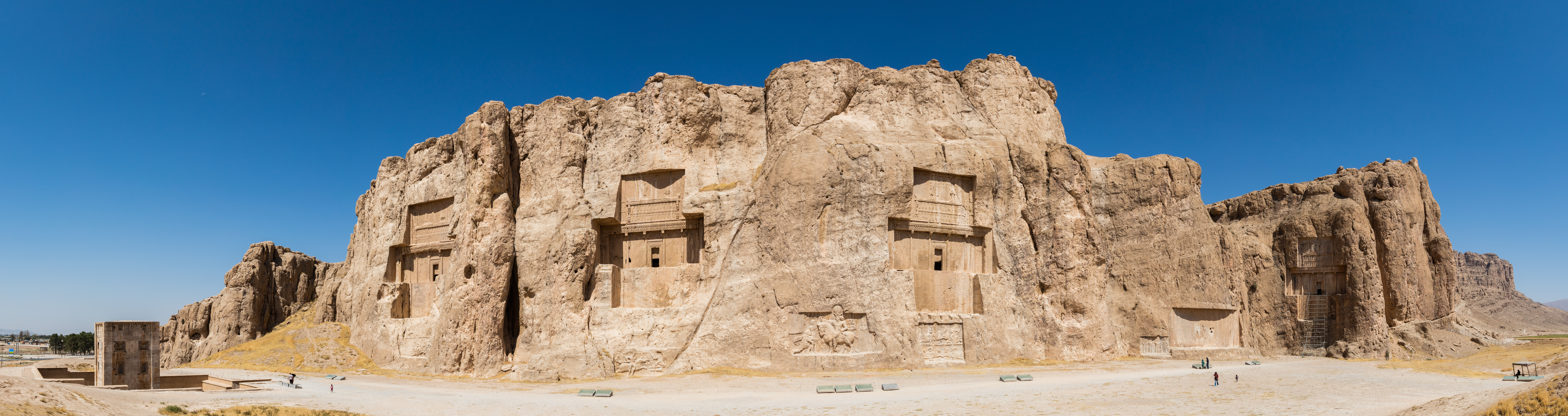
Panorama of Naqsh-e Rustam. Achaemenid tombs above, Sassanian reliefs below. The tombs, from left to right, probably belong to: Darius II, Artaxerxes I, Darius I, Xerxes I

== India ==
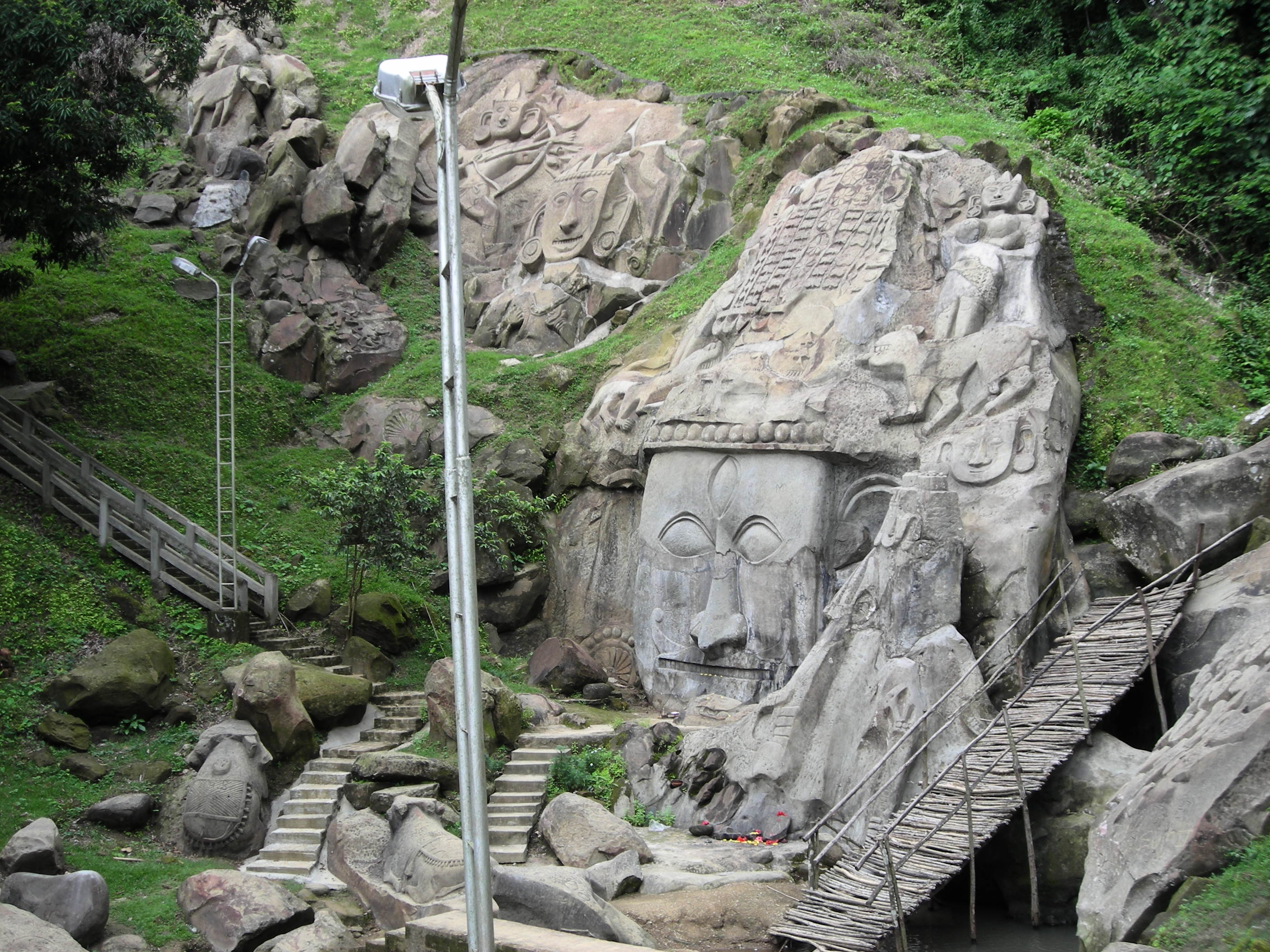
Unakoti group of reliefs of Shiva, Tripura, India, 11th century

Although carving into solid rock is more a feature of Indian sculpture than of any other culture, most Indian sculptures fall outside the strict definition of rock reliefs because they are either fully detached statues, or are reliefs within rock-cut or natural caves, or temples entirely cut from the living rock. In the former group are many colossal Jain figures of tirthankara, and in the later Hindu and Buddhist works at the Elephanta Caves, Ajanta Caves, Ellora, the Aurangabad Caves, and most of the Group of Monuments at Mahabalipuram. Especially at Ajanta, there are many rock reliefs in the open, around the entrances to the caves, either part of the original designs or votive sculptures added later by individual patrons.

However, there are a number of significant rock reliefs in India, with the Descent of the Ganges at Mahabalipuram the best known and perhaps the most impressive. This is a large 7th-century Hindu scene with many figures that uses the form of the rock to shape the image. The Anantashayi Vishnu is an early 9th-century horizontal relief of the reclining Hindu god Vishnu in Orissa, measuring 15.4 metres (51 ft) in length, cut into a flat bed of rock. while the largest standing image is the Gommateshwara statue in Southern India. At Unakoti, Tripura there is an 11th-century group of reliefs related to Shiva, and at Hampi scenes from the Ramayana. Several sites, such as Kalugumalai and the Samanar Hills in Tamil Nadu, have Jain reliefs, mostly of meditating tirthankaras.

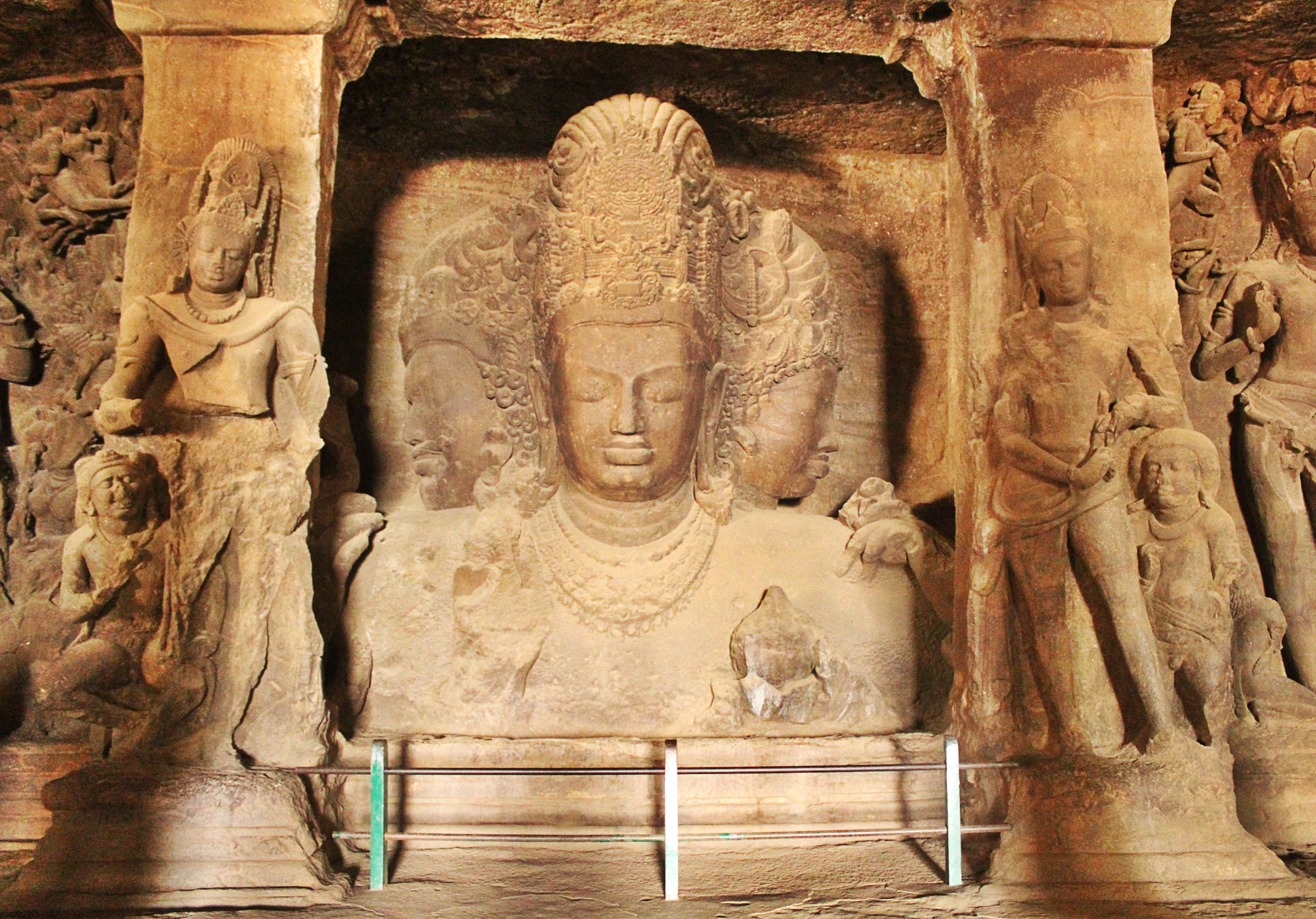
Inside a cave temple at Elephanta, Trimurti Shiva flanked by the dvarapalas, 5-6th century

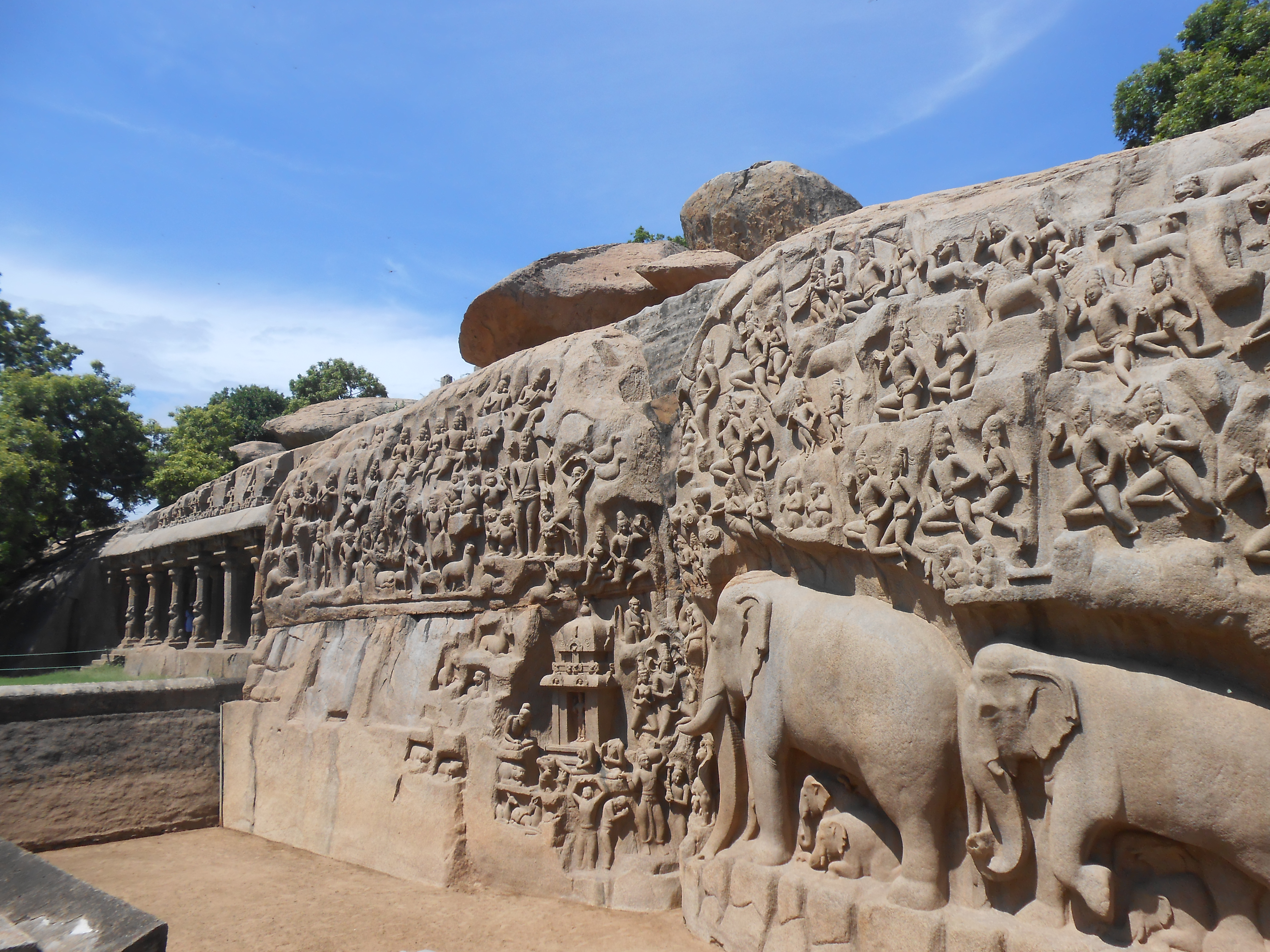
Descent of the Ganges at Mahabalipuram, 7th century

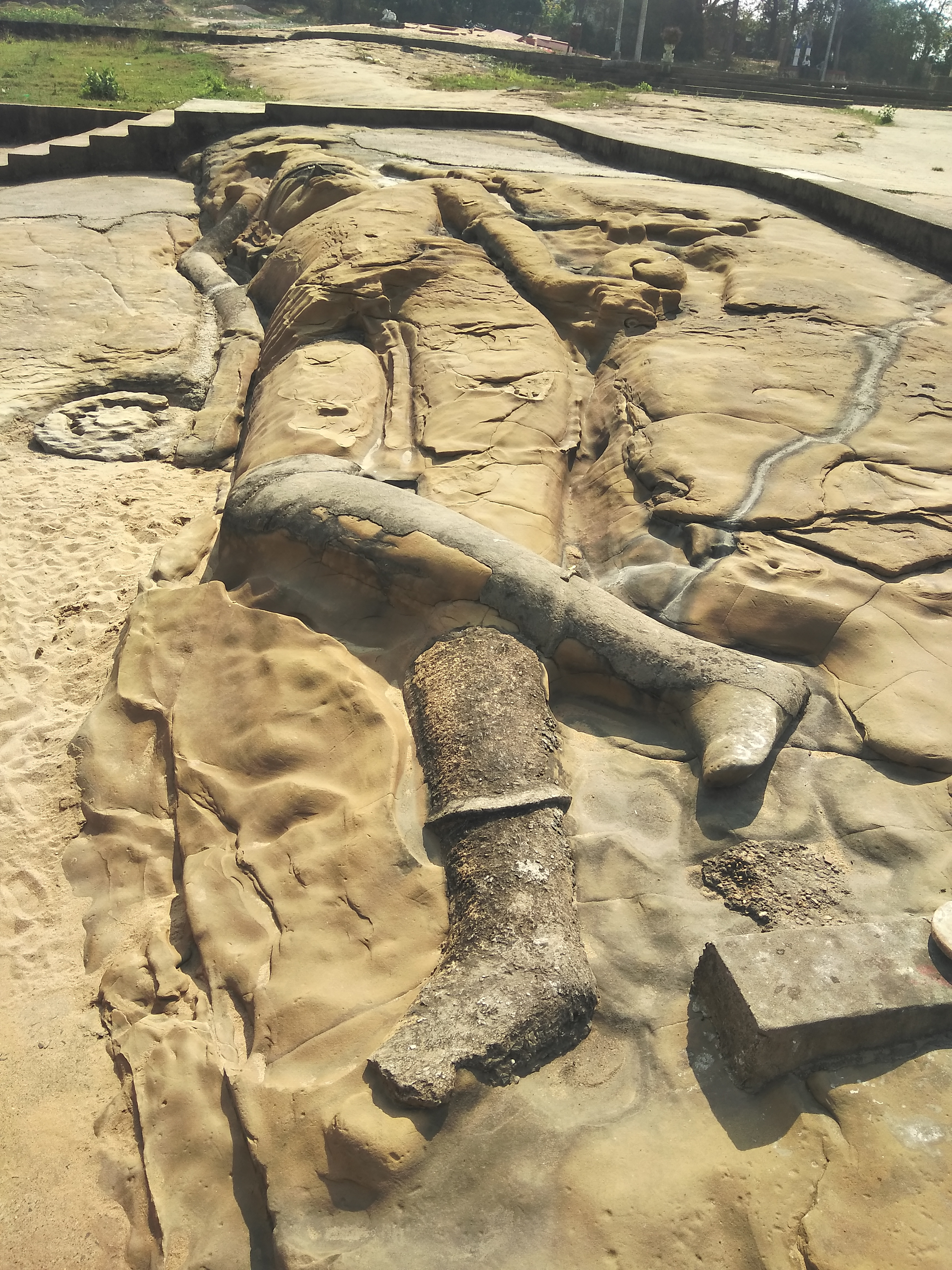
The sleeping Anantashayi Vishnu, 9th century

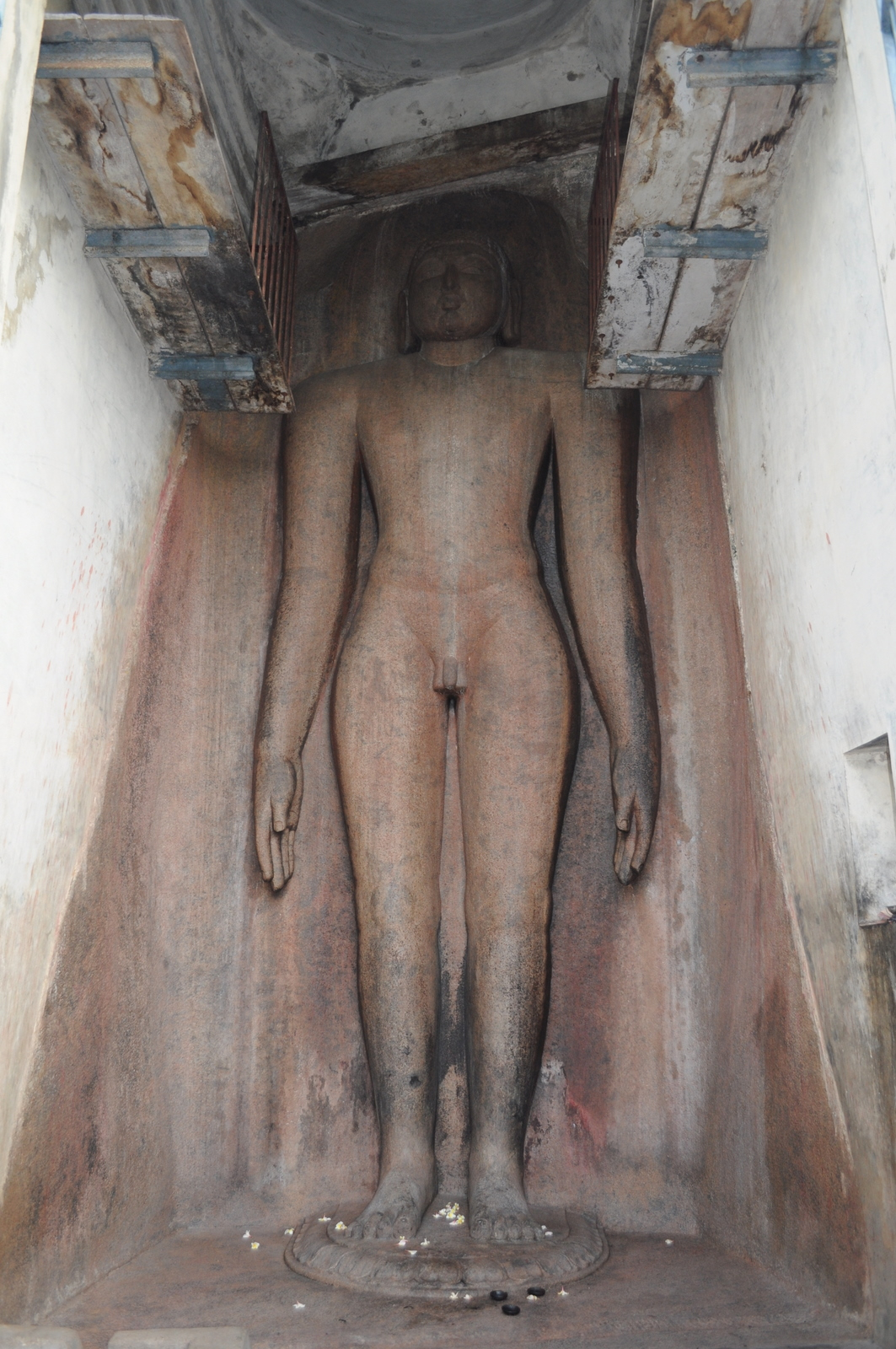
Jain relief of Neminatha at Tirumalai, Tamil Nadu, c. 12th century

== Buddhism ==
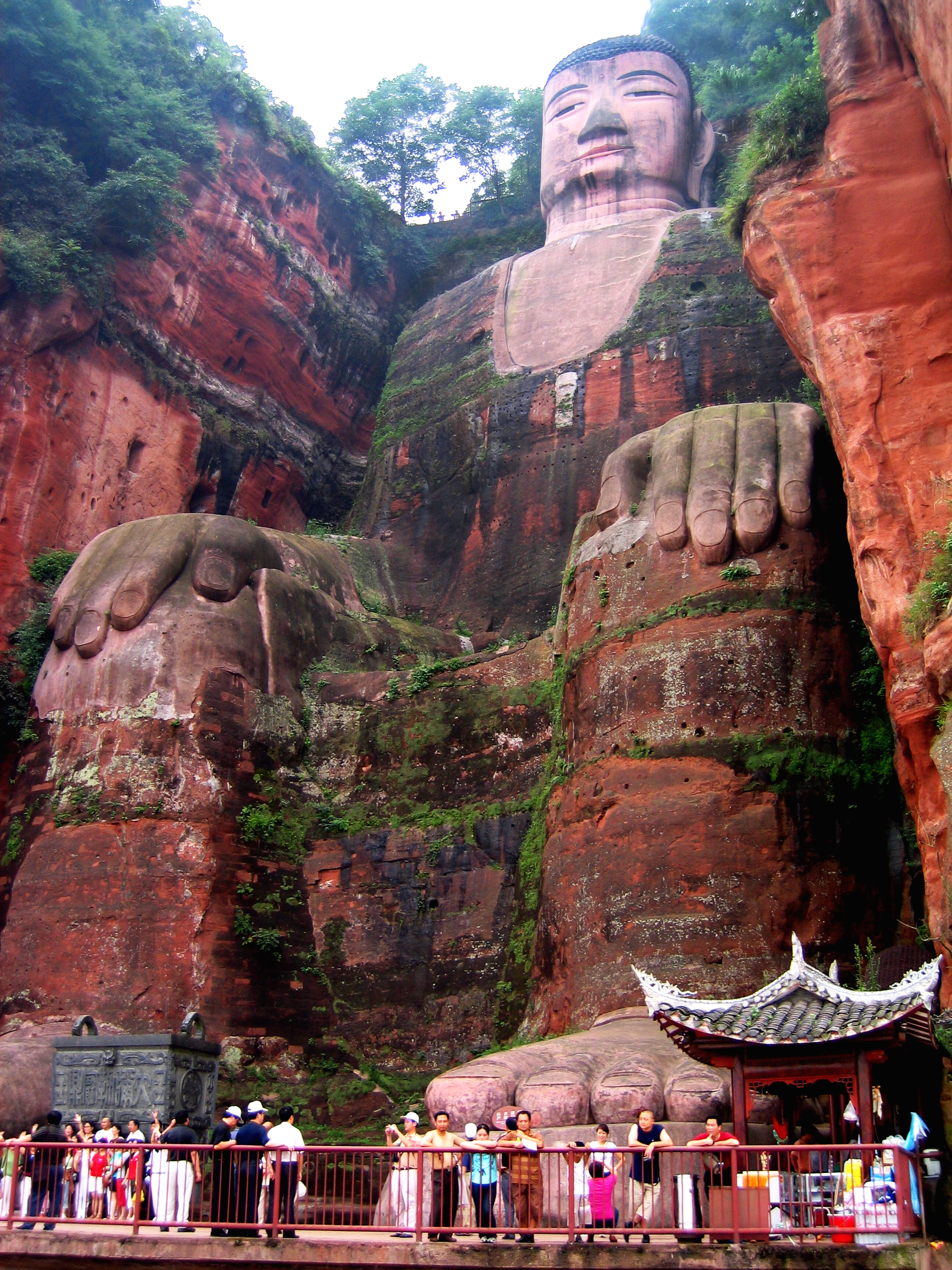
The Tang dynasty Leshan Giant Buddha

Buddhism, originating in India, took the traditions of cave and rock-cut architecture to other parts of Asia, including the creation of rock reliefs. In these the emphasis shifted to religious subject matter; in earlier reliefs deities had normally appeared only to show their approval of the ruler. The colossal Buddha figures are nearly all in very high relief, only still attached to the rock face at the rear. Several have or had "image houses", or buildings enclosing them, which meant that they could normally only be seen very close up, and the impressive view from further back was lost to pilgrims.

In Sri Lanka colossal Buddha figures include the Avukana Buddha statue, 5th century and almost free-standing, with only a narrow strip at the back still connecting it to the cliff, and the four 12-century Buddha figures at Gal Vihara; the brick foundations for image houses can be seen here. The seven 10th-century figures at Buduruvagala are in much lower relief. There are very lively elephants carved around a temple pool at Isurumuniya. Of the colossal lion gateway to the hill-palace at Sigiriya, only the paws remain, the head having fallen off at some point.

The three famous ancient Buddhist sculptural sites in China are the Mogao Caves, Longmen Grottoes (672–673 for the main group) and Yungang Grottoes (460–535), all of which have colossal Buddha statues in very high relief, cut back into huge niches in the cliff, though the largest figure at Mogao is still enclosed by a wooden image house superstructure in front of it; this is also thought to be a portrait of the reigning empress Wu Zetian. One of the Longmen figures is effectively in a man-made cave, but can be seen from outside through a large window opened in the outer face (see gallery). Smaller rock-cut sculptures and paintings decorate the cave temples at these sites.

The Tang dynasty Leshan Giant Buddha, the largest of all, was built with a superstructure covering it, which was destroyed by the Mongols. Such large figures were a novelty in Chinese art, and adapted conventions from further west. The Dazu Rock Carvings include scenes with unusually large numbers of figures, such as a famous and large scene of the Buddhist Judgement of Souls. These are set back into the cliff and the shelter has enabled them to retain their bright colours. Other Chinese Buddhist cave sites with external rock reliefs include Lingyin Temple with many small reliefs, and the Maijishan Grottoes with a main colossal group; unusually for figures of such a size, they are in bas-relief.

The Bamiyan Buddha figures were two standing Buddha figures of the 6th century in Afghanistan which were destroyed by the Taliban in 2001; they probably were one of the immediate influences on the Chinese sites further east on the Silk Road. In Japan the Nihon-ji temple includes a colossal seated Buddha completed in 1783, 31 metres tall. Japanese "Great Buddha" statues are called "daibutsu", but most are in bronze.

Sites elsewhere include Kbal Spean near Angkor in Cambodia, which has both Hindu and Buddhist reliefs. These are placed in rocky shallows of the river, with water flowing over them. Large numbers of short lingams and deities were intended to purify the water that flowed over them on its way to the city.

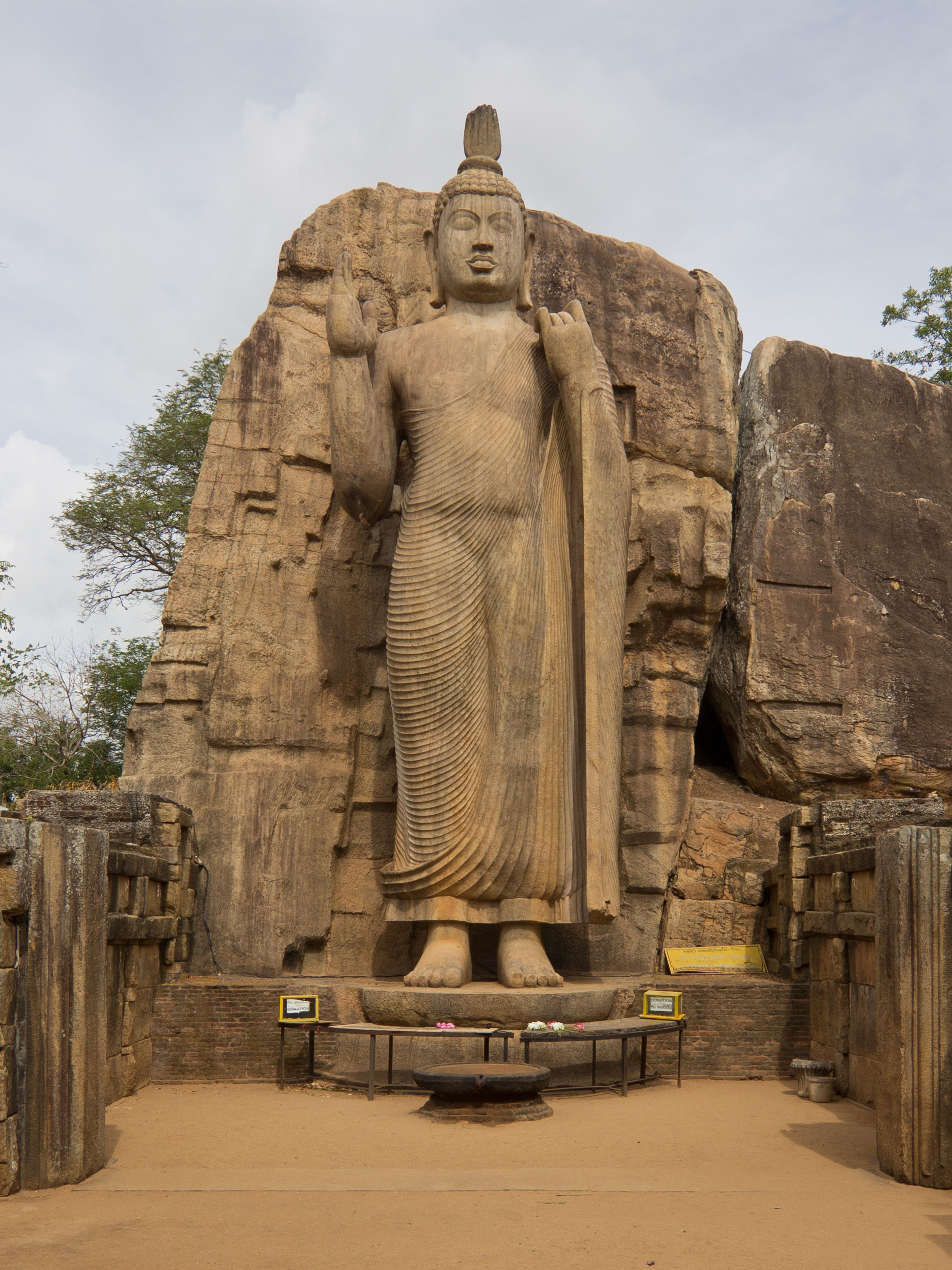
Avukana Buddha statue, Sri Lanka, 5th century

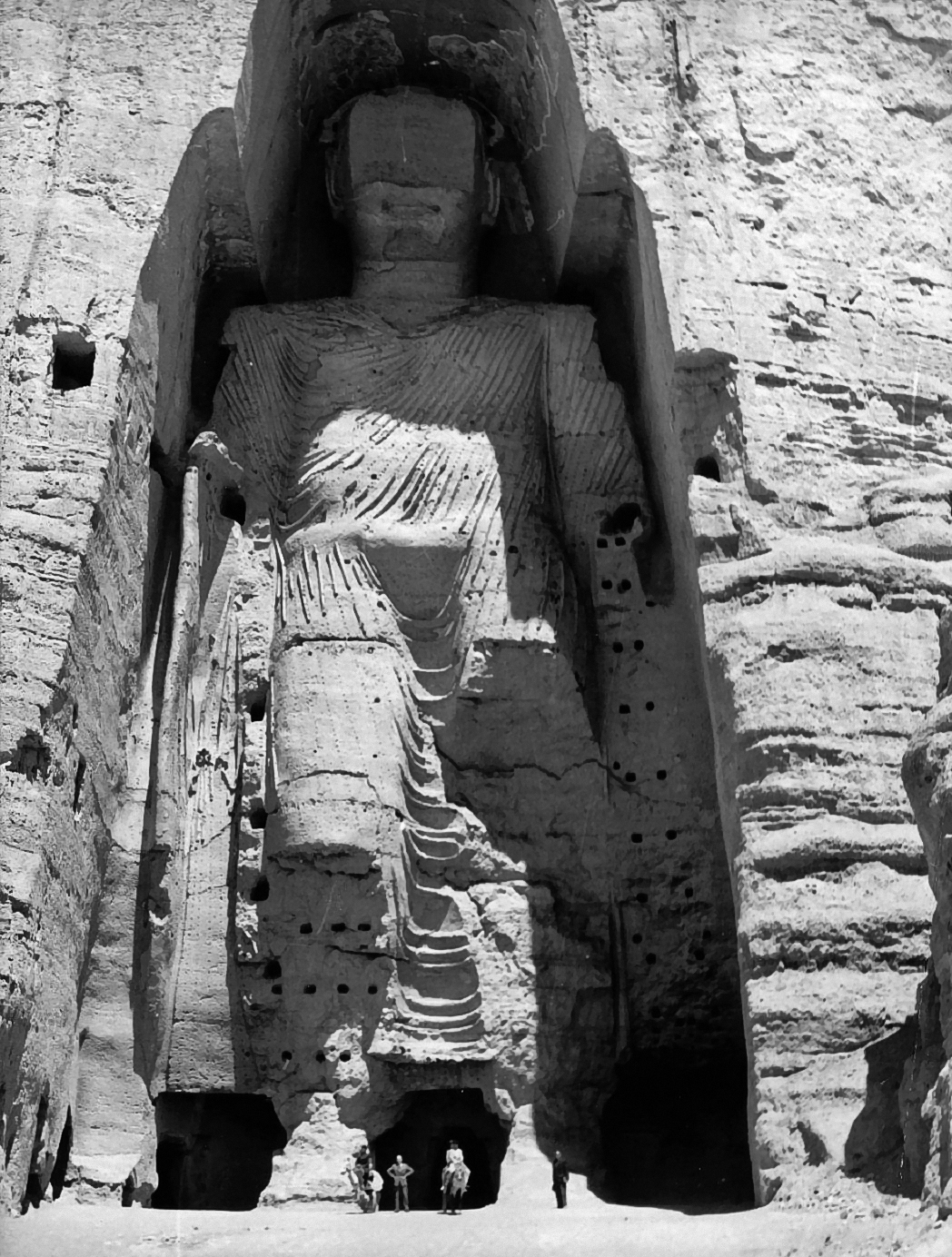
The larger of the Buddhas of Bamiyan in 1963, before it was destroyed

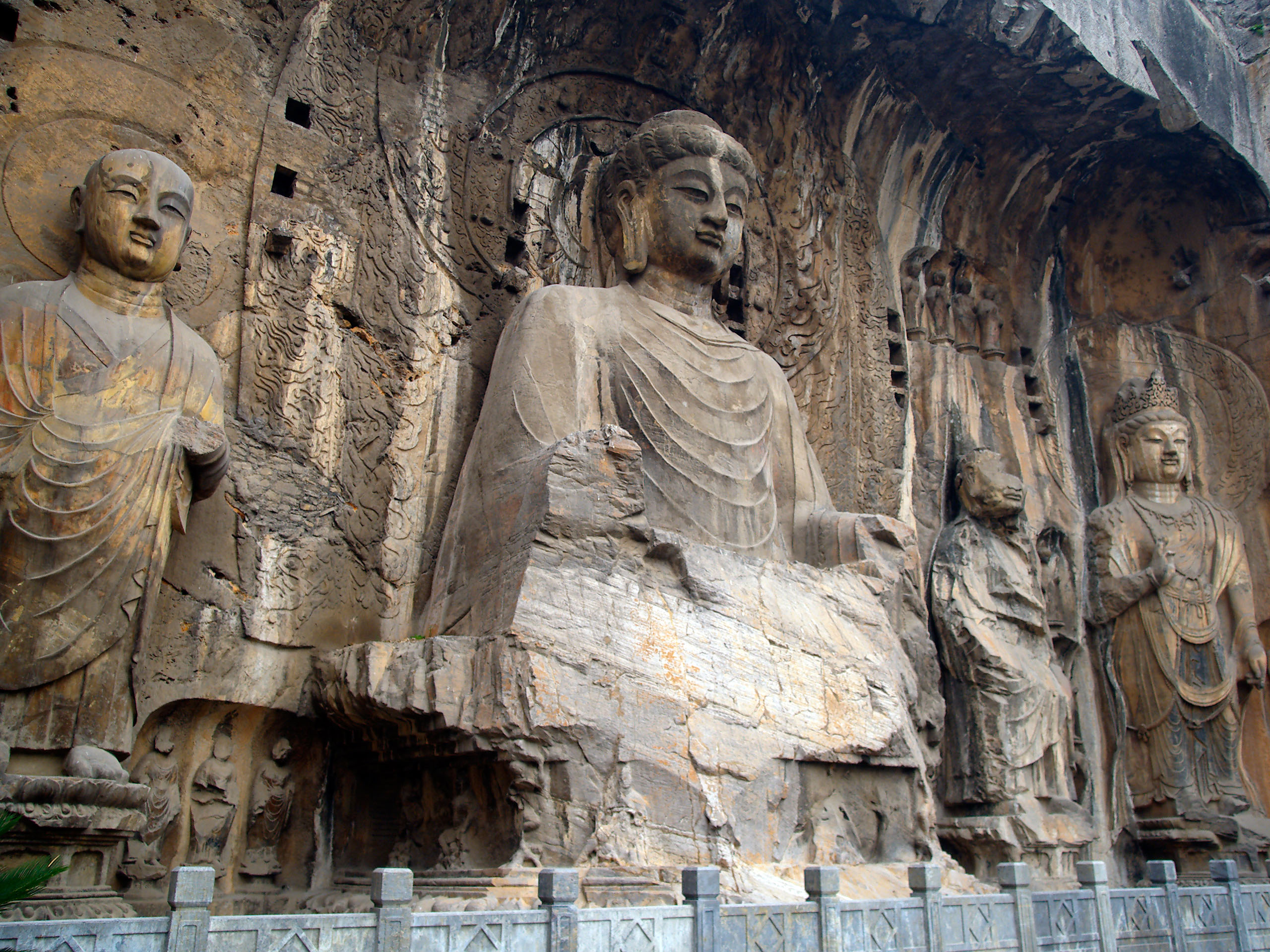
Part of the Longmen Grottos

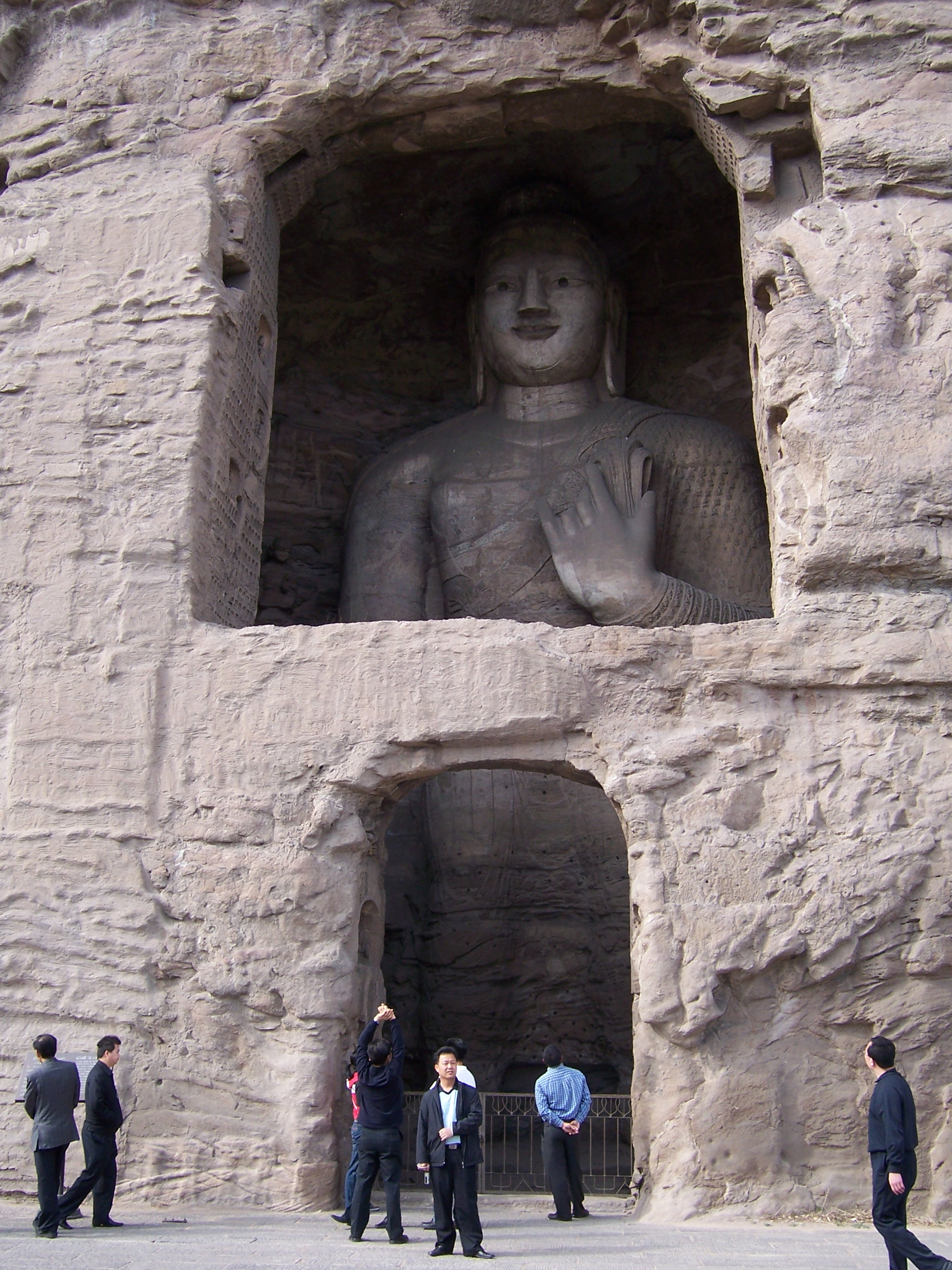
No 5 at the Yungang Grottoes

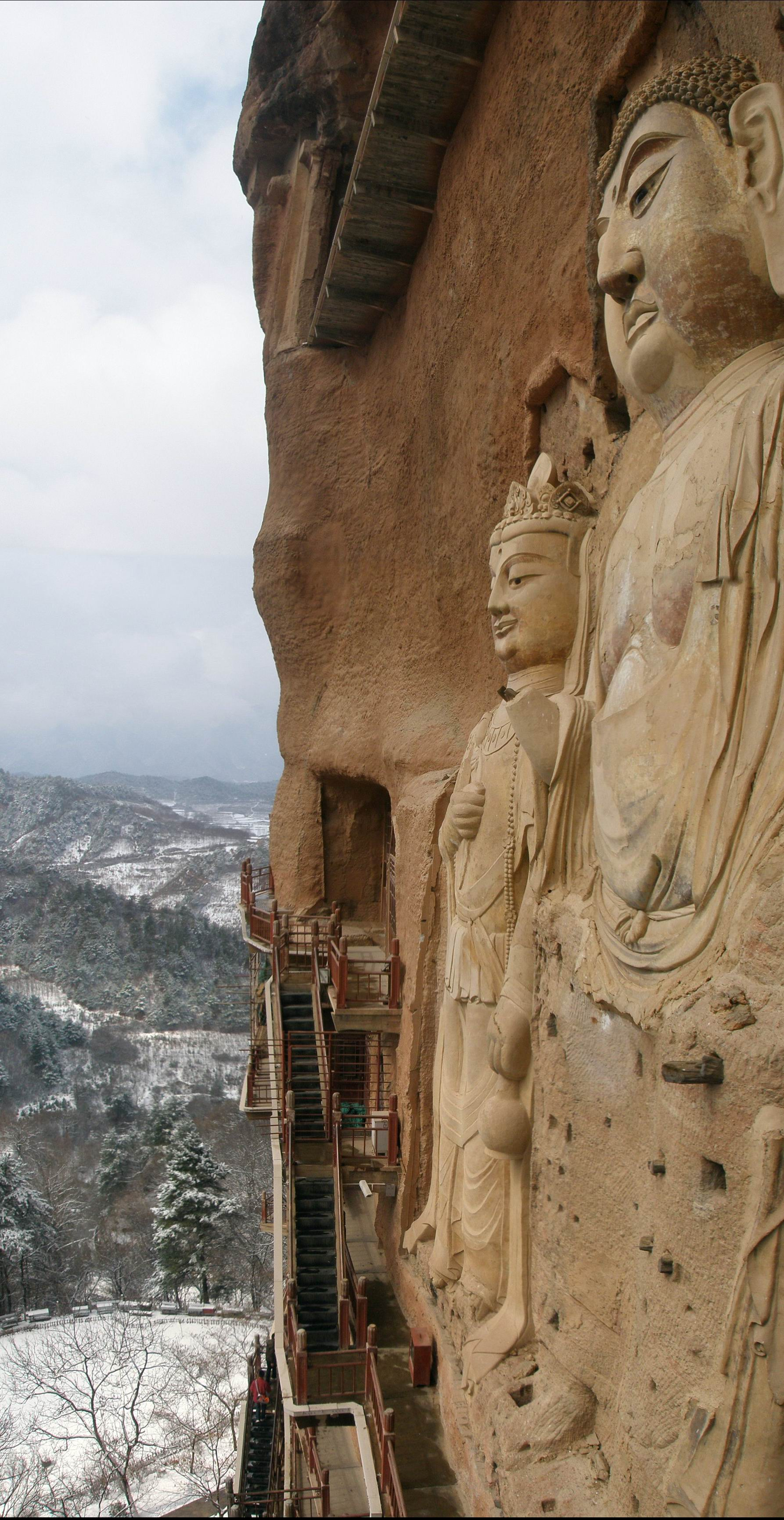
Detail of the colossal group at the Maijishan Grottoes

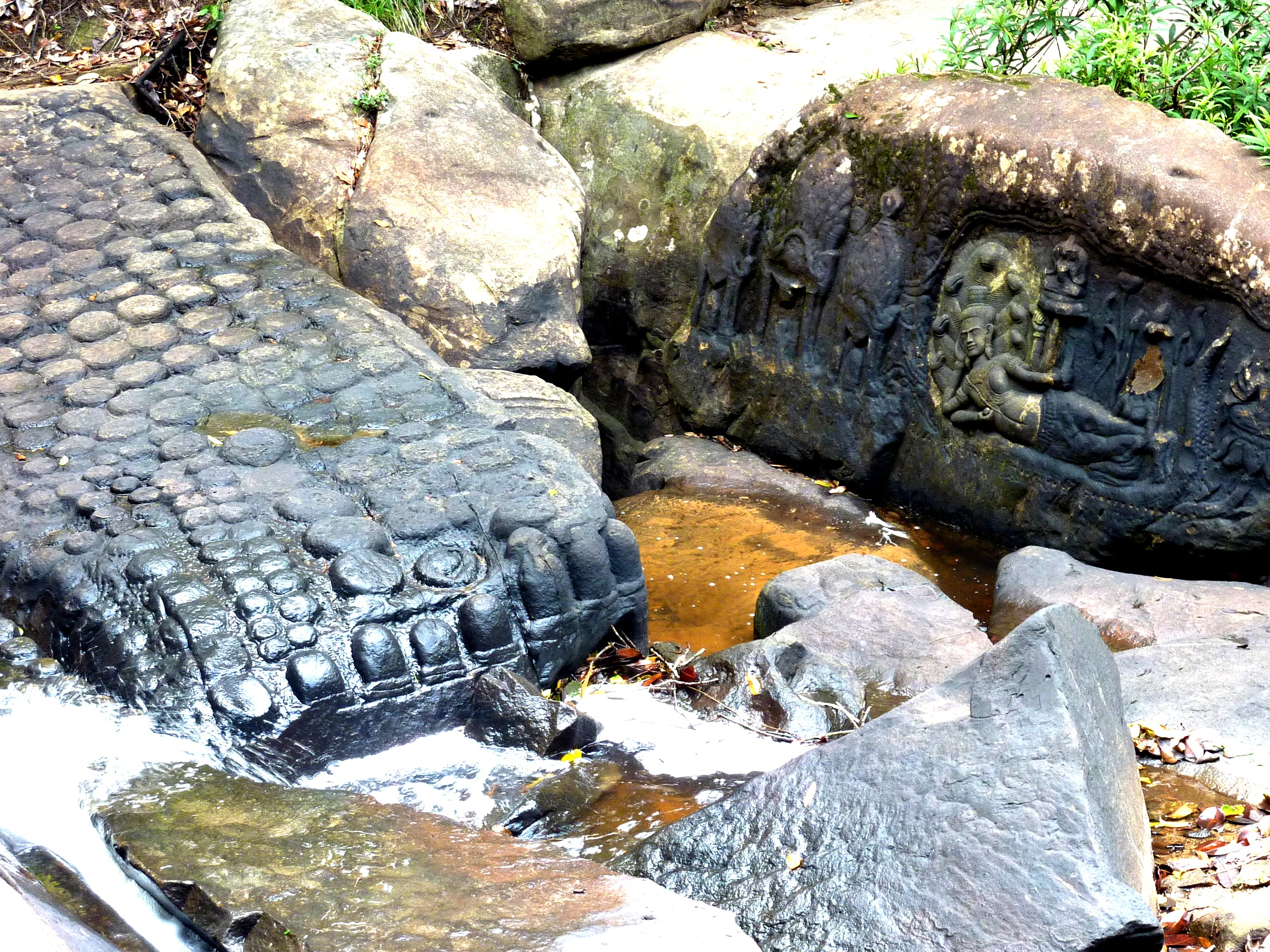
Kbal Spean, Vishnu and lingams

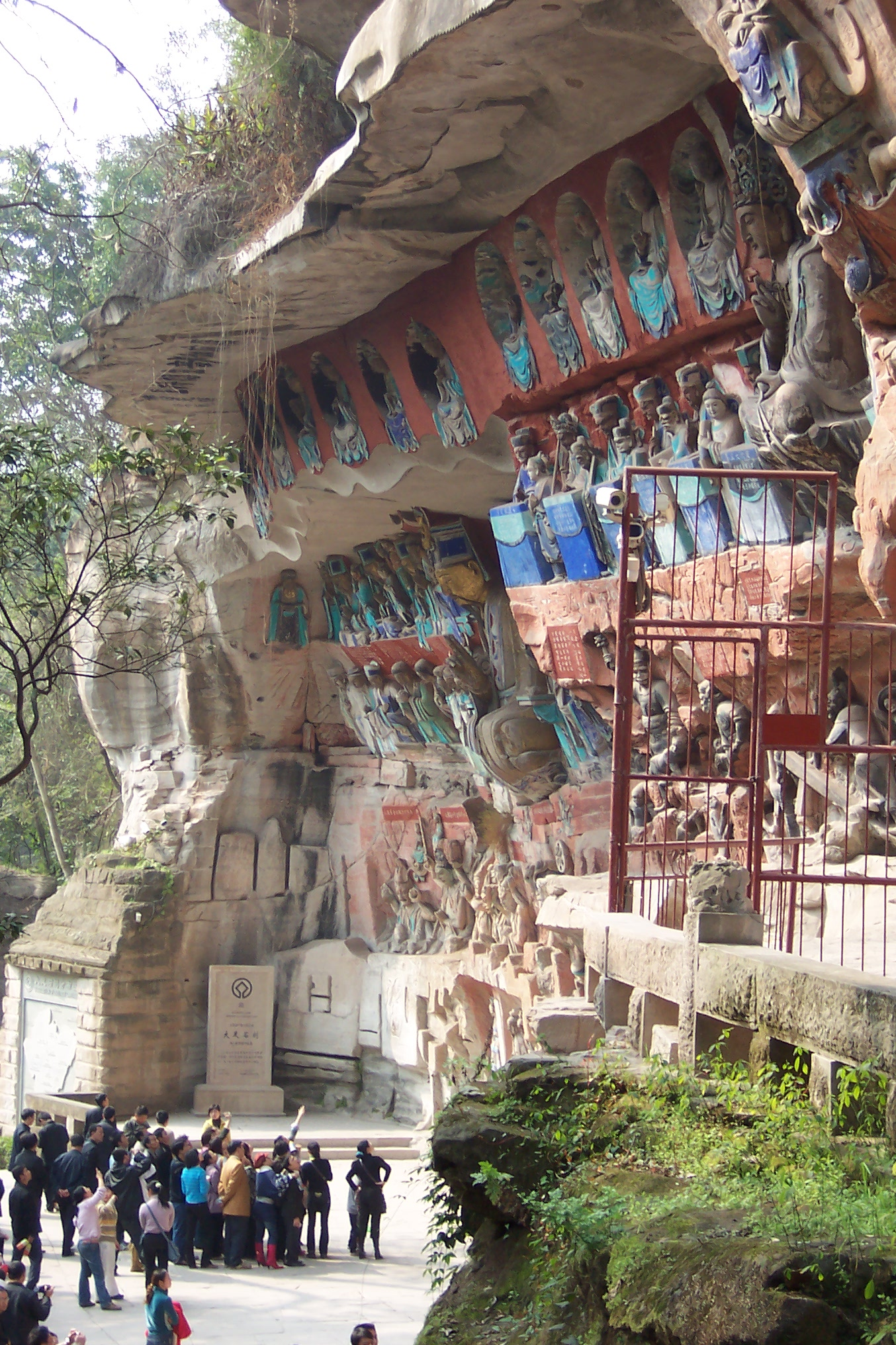
Details of part of the Dazu rock carvings

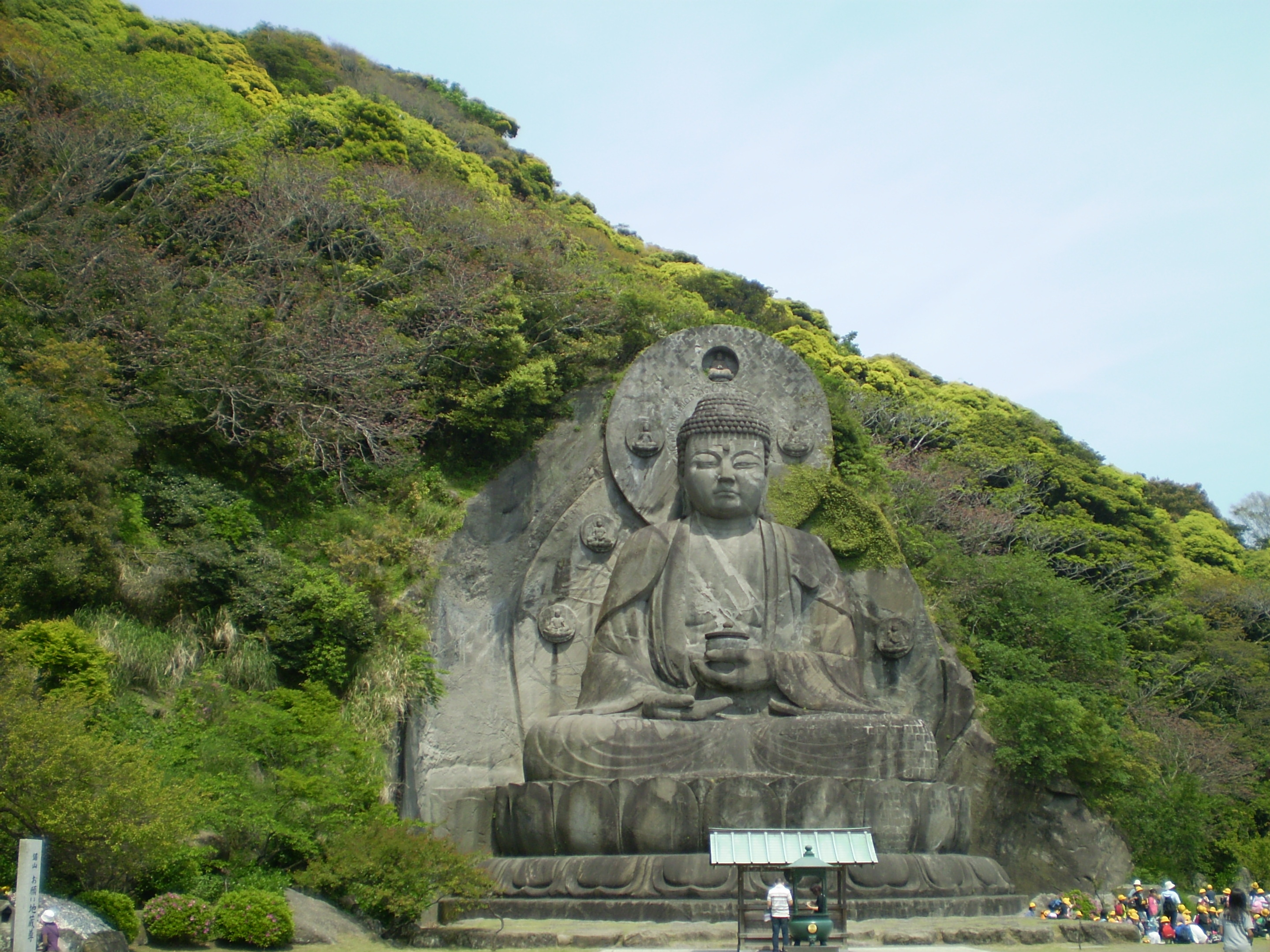
The Nihon-ji daibutsu, 1783

== Greek and Roman world ==
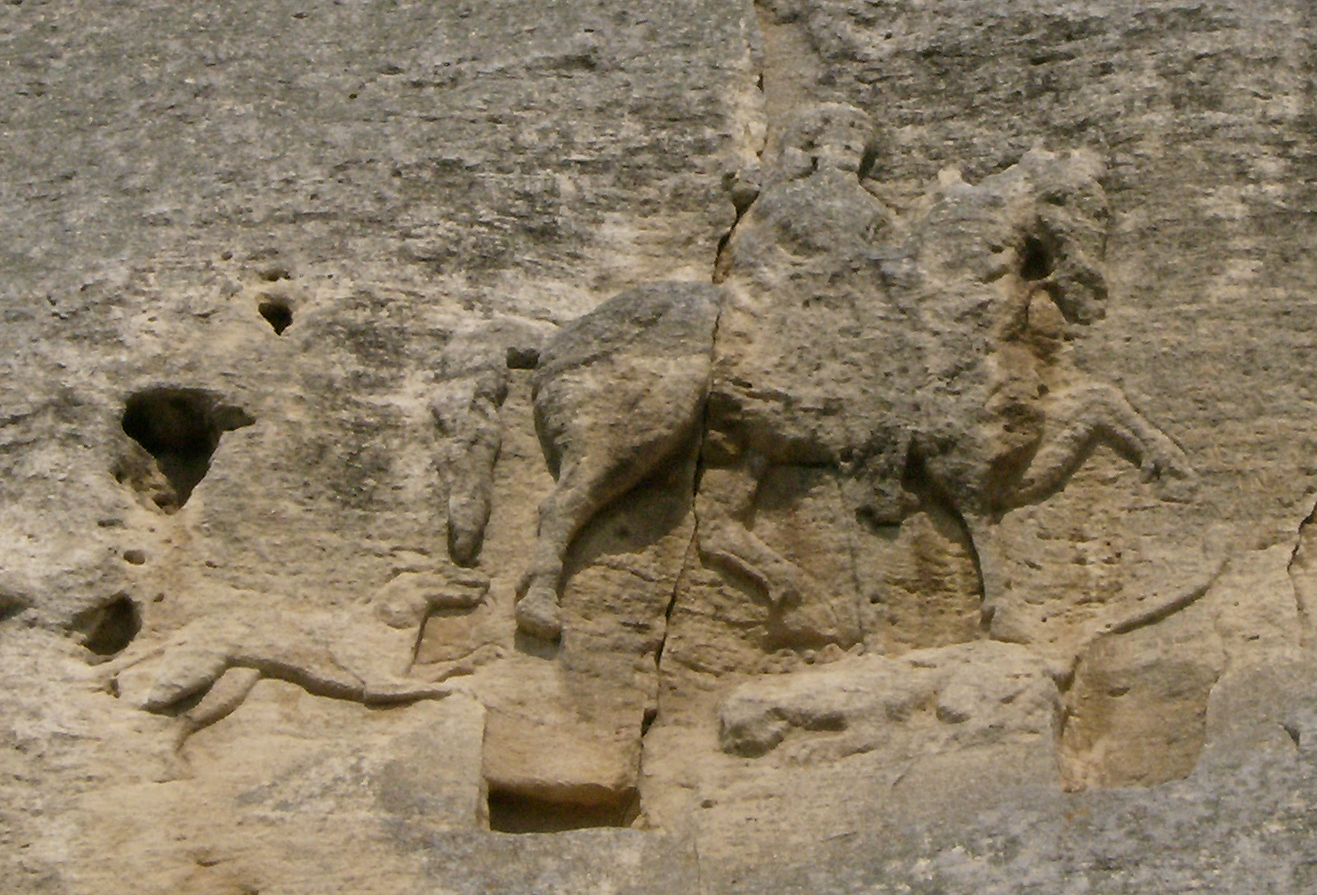
Madara Rider in Bulgaria, cut around 700

The Greco-Roman Athena relief of Sömek in modern Turkey, with a warrior nearby, are two of the relatively few examples from the ancient Greek and Roman worlds. Nearby at Adamkayalar there are a series of standing figures in classical niches, probably funerary memorials of the 2nd century AD; similar figures are found at Kanlidivane. All these sites are from former Hittite and Neo-Hittite territories. The cliff at Behistun, as well as Darius's famous relief, has a Seleucid reclining Hercules of 148 BC with a Greek inscription. Also from the fringes of the Roman world, the famous rock-cut tombs of Petra, Jordan include figurative elements, mostly now battered by iconoclasm, for example the best-known tomb, known as The Treasury.

== Medieval Europe ==
Standing alone in early medieval Europe is the Madara Rider in Bulgaria, cut around 700 above the palace of a ruler of the Bulgars. It shows a rider, about double life-size, spearing a lion, with a dog running behind him. Though the medium of rock relief is without parallels anywhere near, this motif, known as the Thracian horseman, had long been common on stelae in the region, and such motifs appear in metalwork, such as the ewer with a mounted warrior and his prisoner in the enigmatic Treasure of Nagyszentmiklós, and are common in Sasanian silver bowls, which may well have been traded as far as the Balkans.

The (probably) 12th-century Externsteine relief in southern Germany measures 4.8 m high by 3.7 m wide. It shows the Descent from the Cross of Jesus, a standard scene from Christian art, with a total of ten figures. The circumstances of its making remain unclear, and despite the extensive tradition of medieval reliefs on buildings, making them on natural rock formations at a large size remained very rare.

== Americas ==
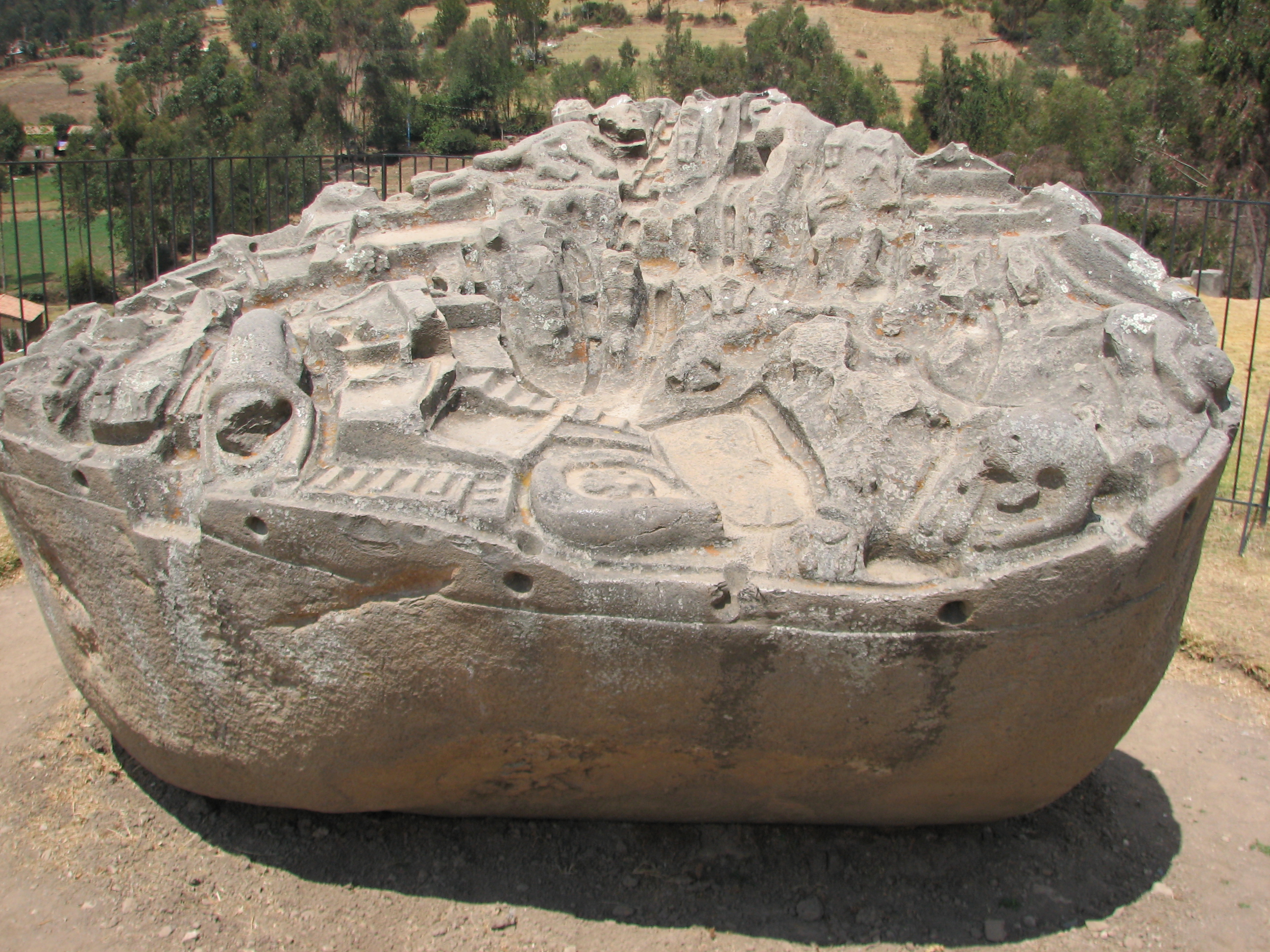
The Inca Sayhuite Stone

Pre-Columbian rock reliefs, mostly using a low relief, include those at Chalcatzingo in Mexico, probably from around 900–700 BC. These reflect Olmec style, though the city was controlled by local rulers. They are on vertical cliff faces, and comparable in style and subject matter to stelae and architectural reliefs in the same tradition.

The Inca tradition is very distinctive; they carved rock with mainly horizontal representations of landscapes as one form of huaca; the most famous are the Sayhuite Stone and the Quinku rock. These show a landscape, but also many animals; it is not clear if the landscapes represent a real place or are imaginary. These permanent works formed part of a wider Inca tradition of visualizing and modelling landscapes, often accompanied by rituals.

== Modern ==
Modern rock reliefs tend to be colossal, at several times life-size, and are usually memorials of some sort. In America, Mount Rushmore is mostly in a very high relief, and the Stone Mountain relief commemorating three Confederate generals in bas-relief. The rock sculpture of Decebalus in Romania is a huge face on an outcrop above the Danube, begun in 1994. The Lion Monument or Lion of Lucerne, in Lucerne, Switzerland, is one of the most artistically successful, designed by Bertel Thorvaldsen and carved in 1820–21 by Lukas Ahorn, as a memorial for the Swiss Guards who were massacred in 1792 during the French Revolution.

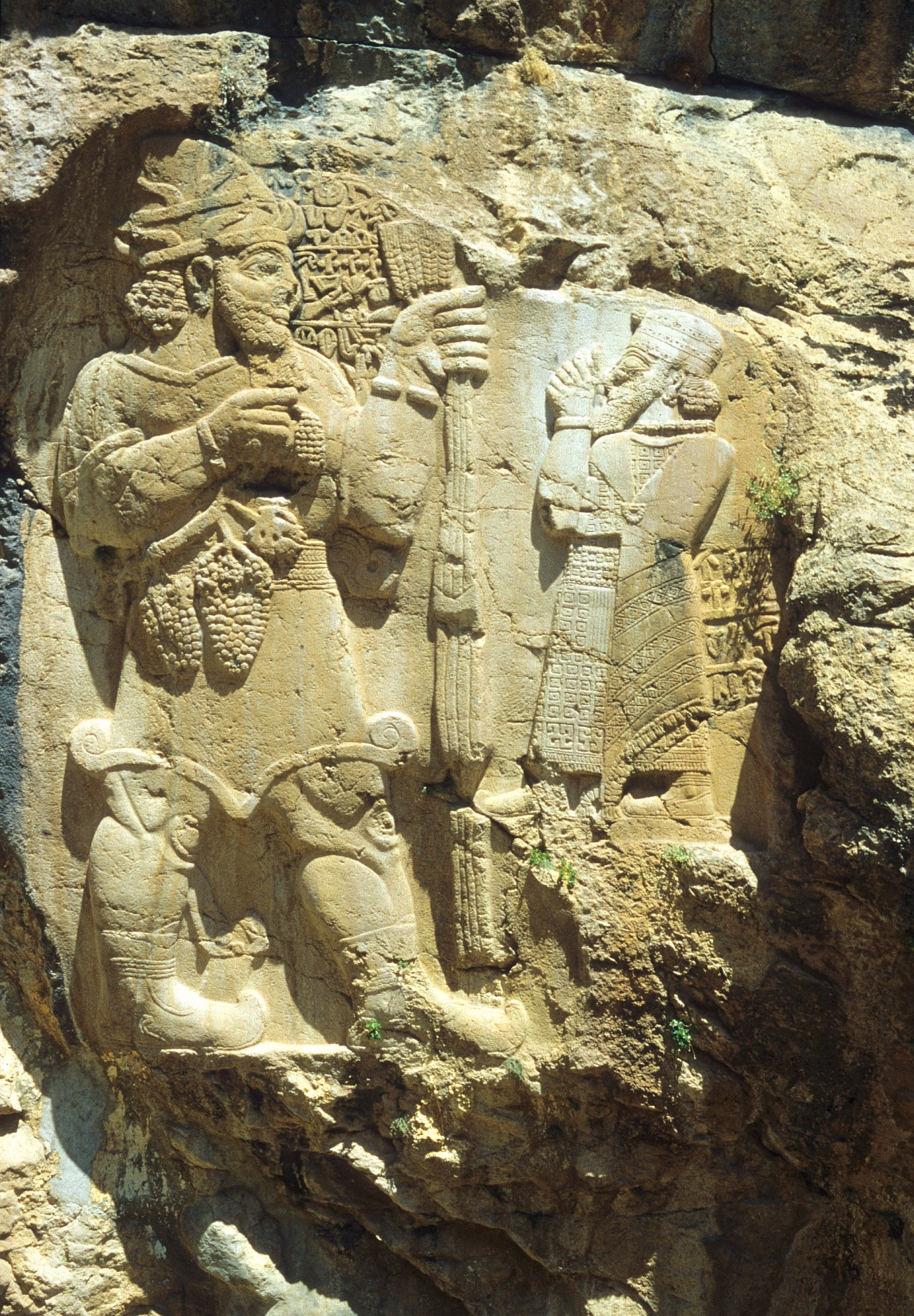
The Hittite İvriz relief; King Warpalawas (right) before the god Tarhunzas

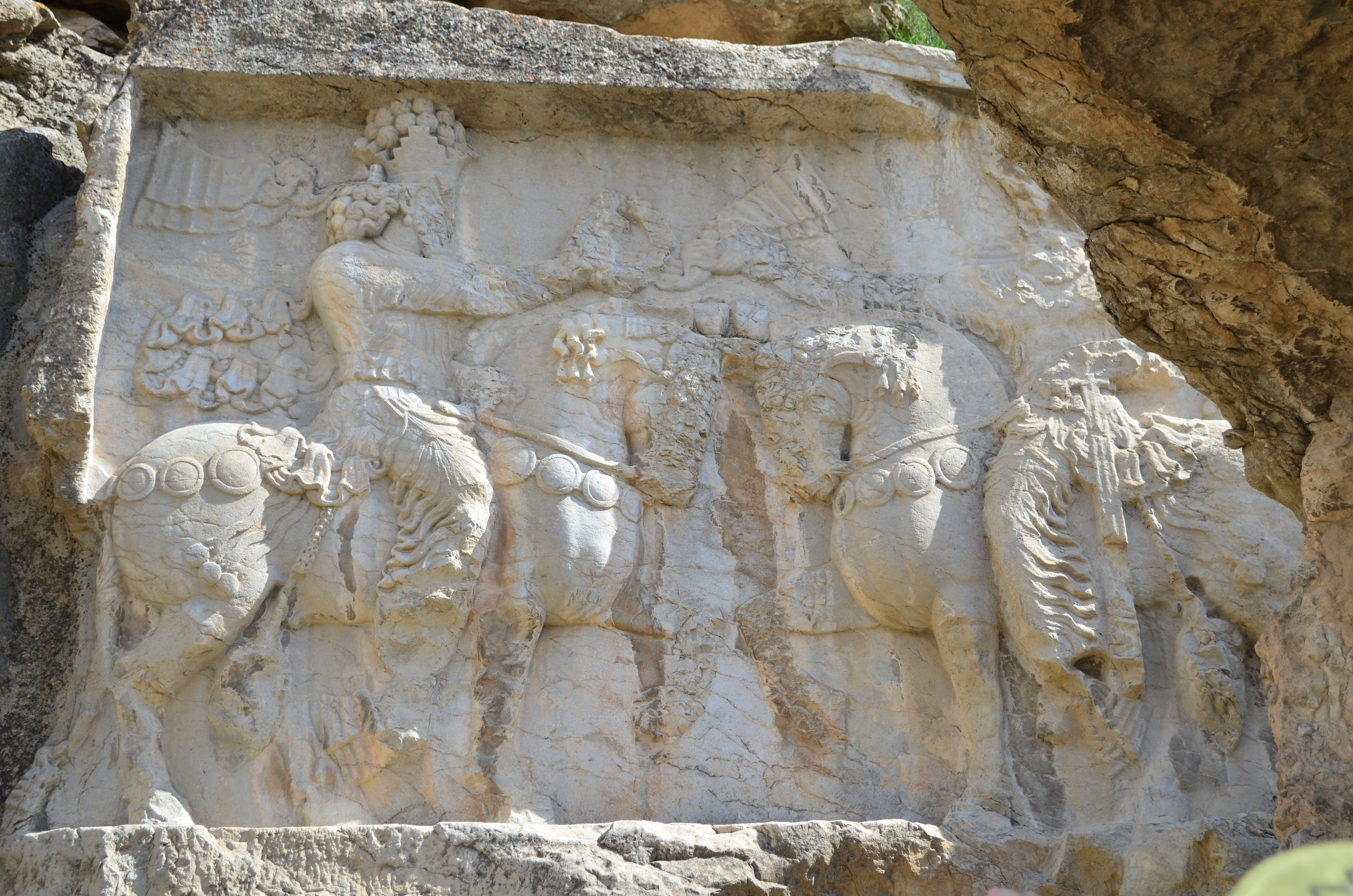
Sassanian investiture relief of Shapur I at Naqsh-e Rajab

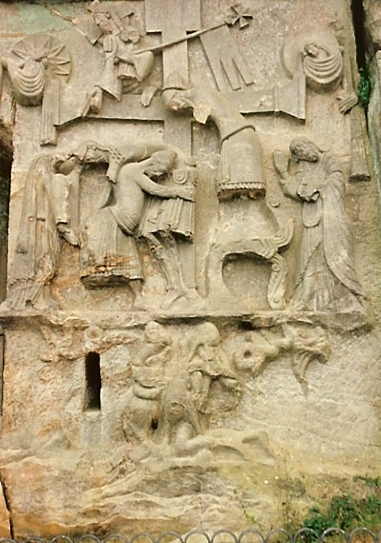
12th-century Externsteine relief, Germany, with the Descent from the Cross of Jesus

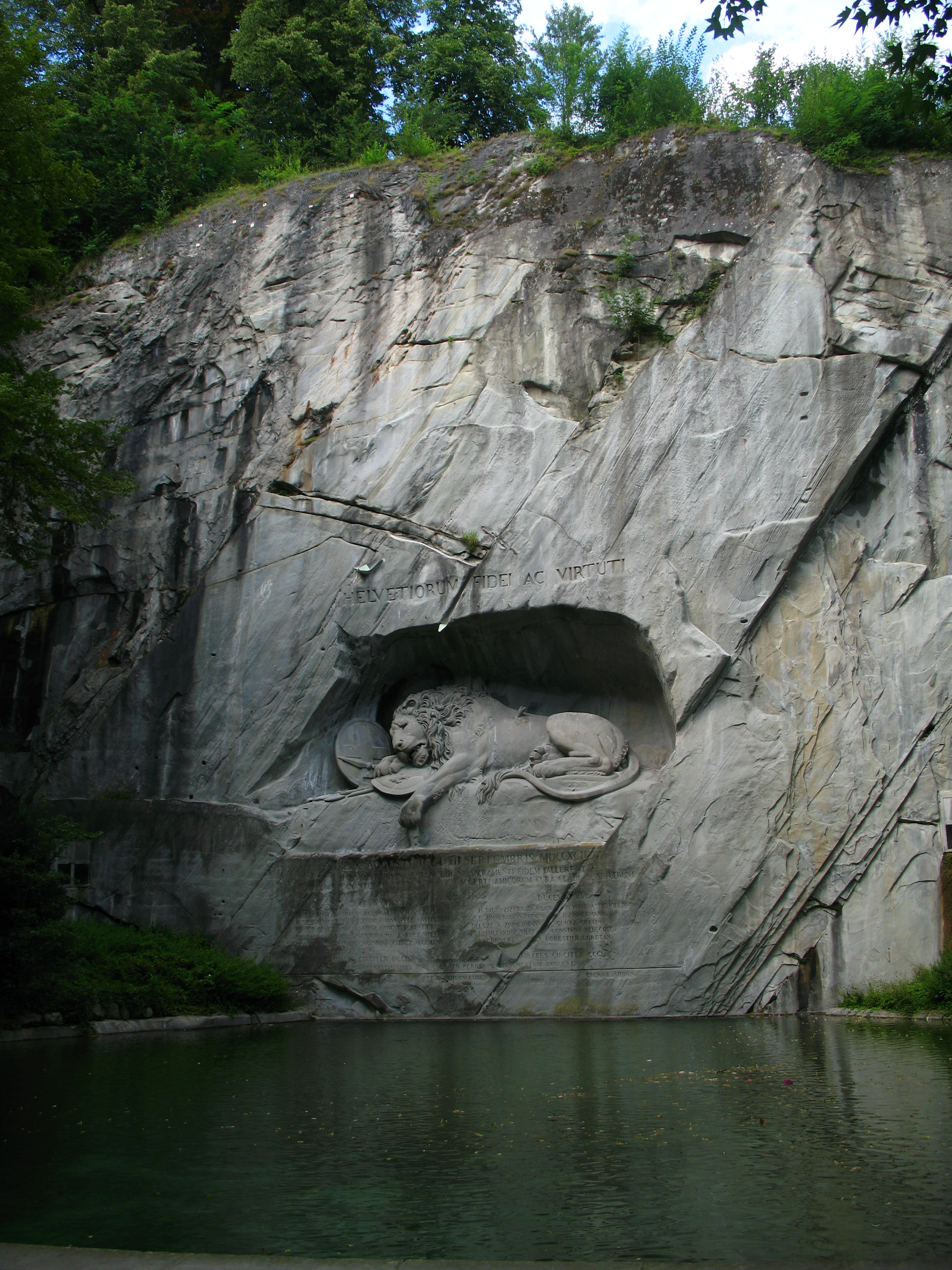
The Lion Monument of Lucerne

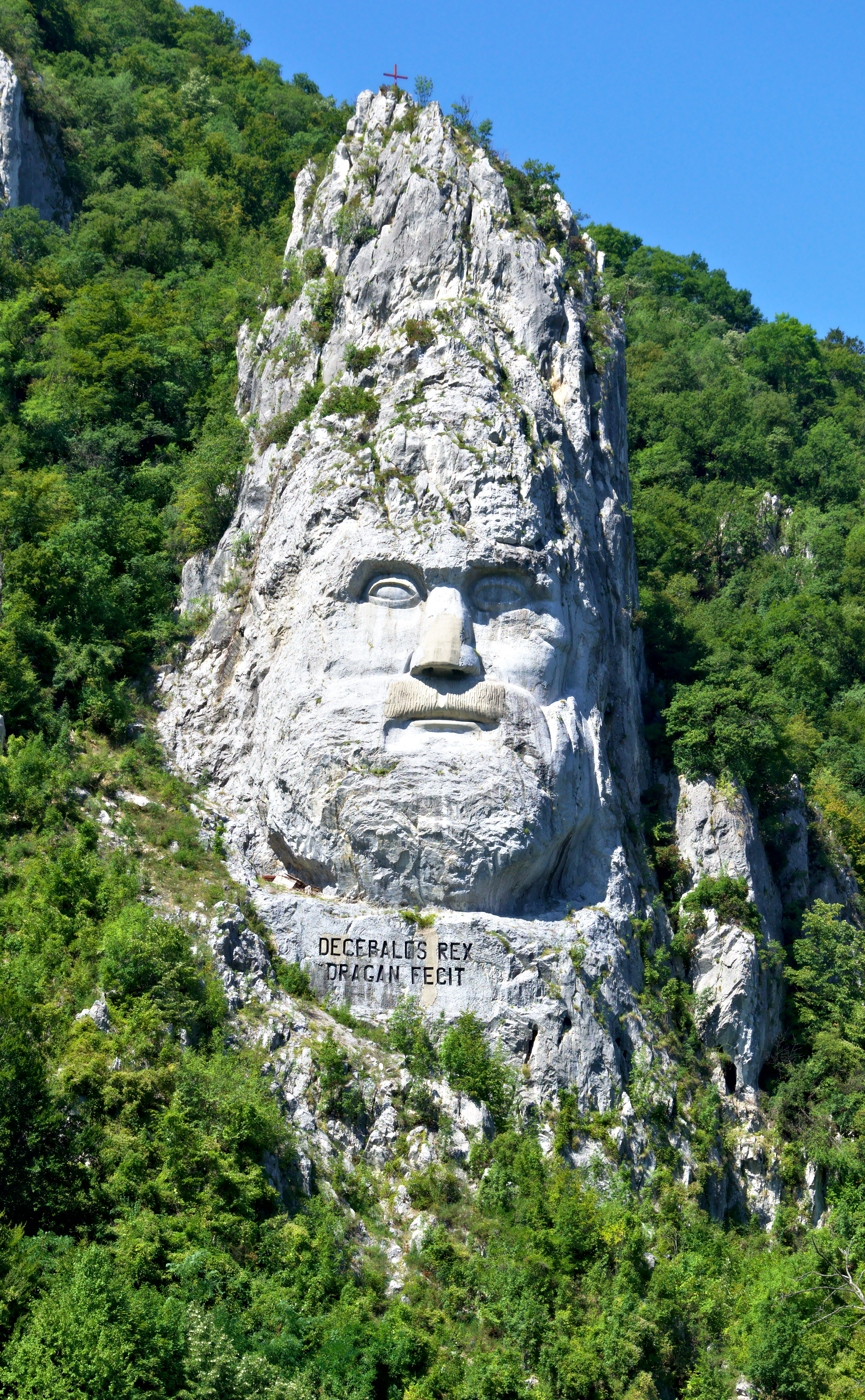
The Rock sculpture of Decebalus of the Iron Gates, Romania.

== See also ==
- List of colossal sculpture in situ
