= Sömek, Silifke =

Sömek
- Neighbourhood
- Location in Turkey
- Coordinates: 36°35′N 34°05′E
- Country: Turkey
- Province: Mersin
- District: Silifke
- Elevation: 885 m (2,904 ft)
- Population (2022): 817
- Time zone: UTC+3 (TRT)
- Postal code: 33940
- Area code: 0324

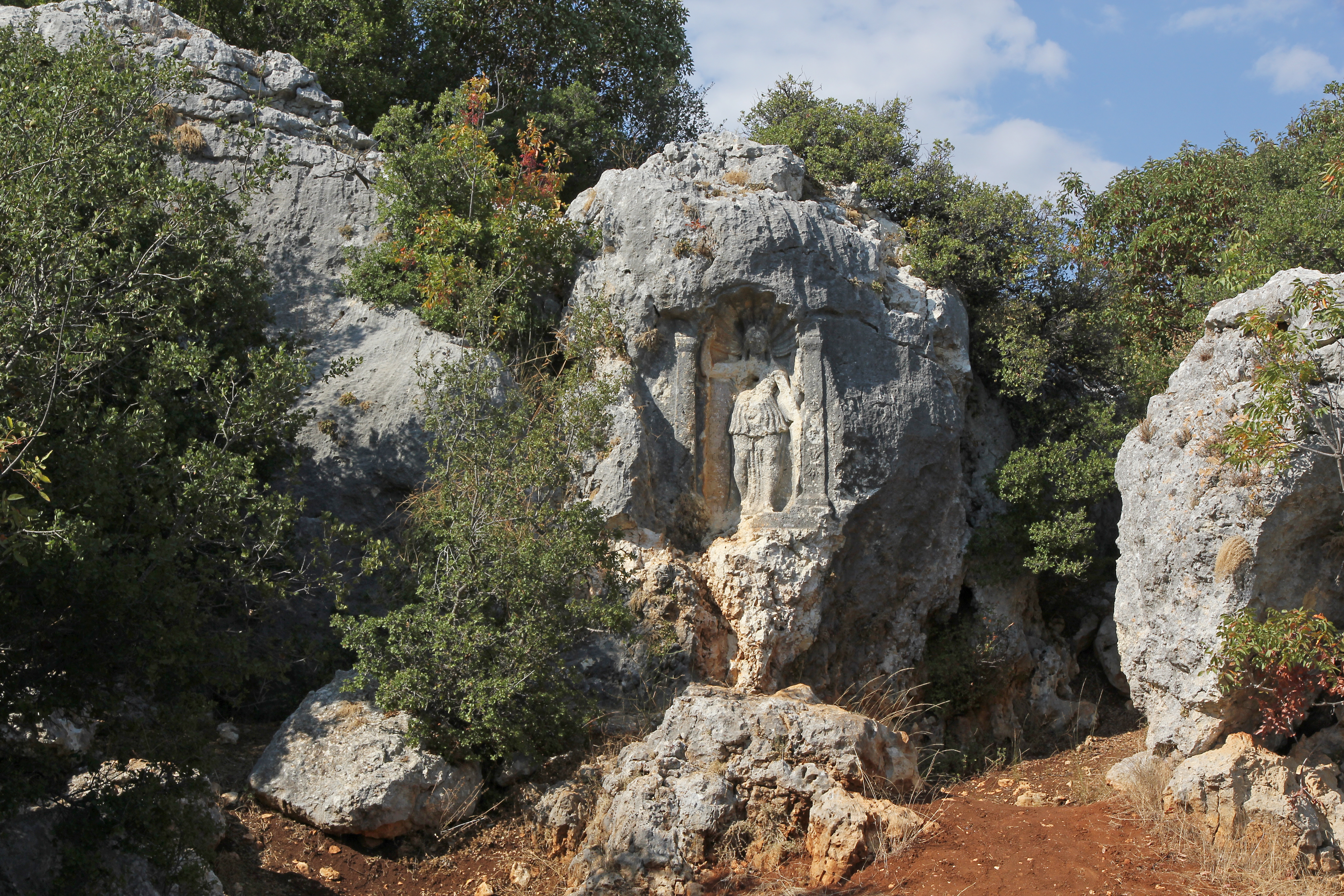

Sömek is a neighbourhood in the municipality and district of Silifke, Mersin Province, Turkey. Its population is 817 (2022). The village is situated in the peneplane area of Toros Mountains. The distance to Silifke is 37 kilometres (23 mi) and to Mersin is 85 kilometres (53 mi).

Like most other settlements in Mersin Province, the area around Sömek has many ancient ruins. The rock relief of Athena which is situated 3 kilometres (1.9 mi) north of the village shows the Isaurian history of the area. There are also the ruins of two churches which were built probably in the Byzantine era of 5th or 6th centuries. Although the east church has completely been demolished, an official archaeology group with the collaboration of Mersin University is working to unearth the west church. There are also ruins of various houses and cisterns around the east church.
