= Assyrian statue (BM 124963) =

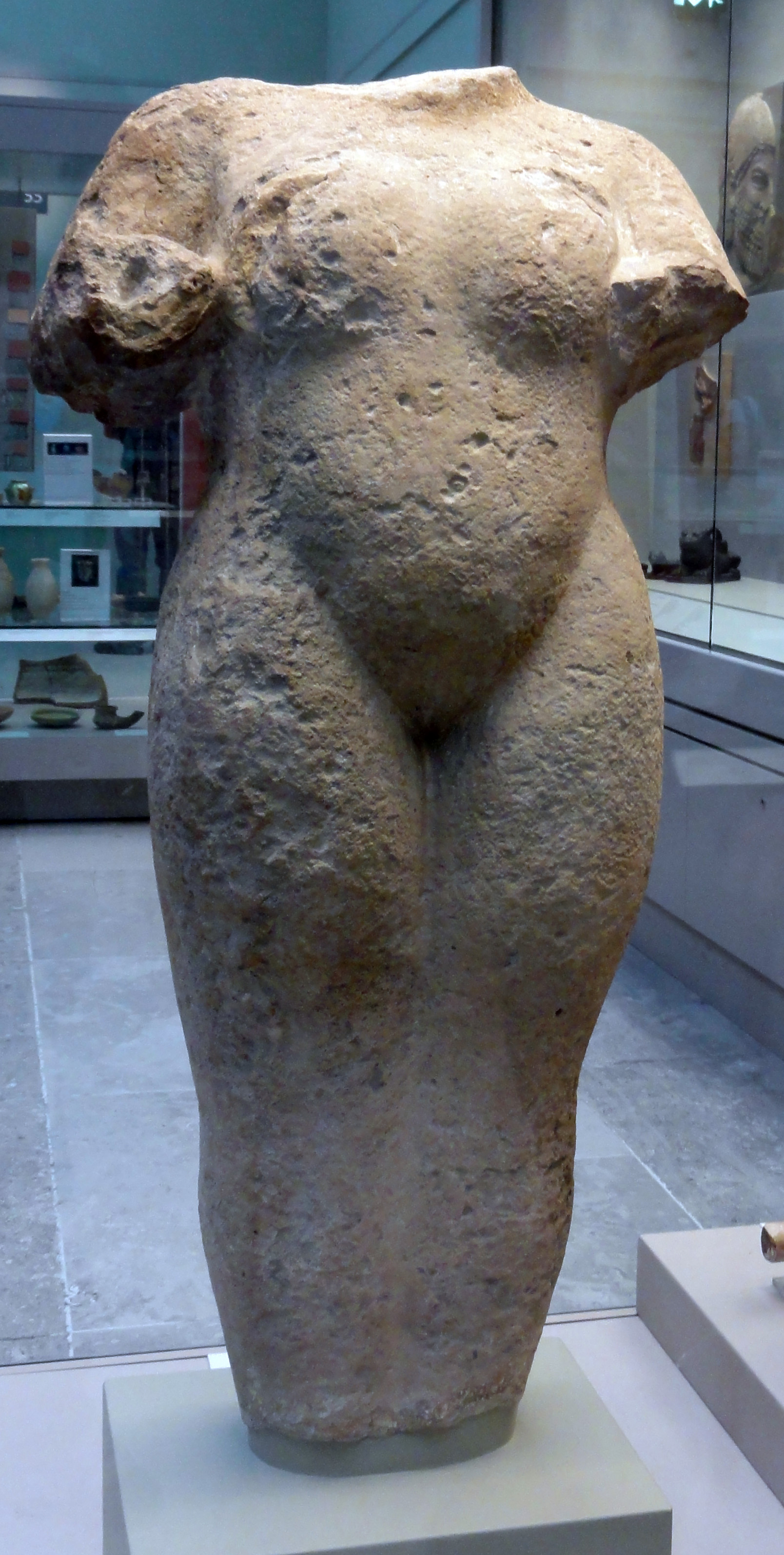
- Front view of Assyrian statue BM 124963
- Material: Limestone
- Height: 97 cm
- Width: 47 cm
- Created: c. 1065 BC
- Discovered: 1853; Mosul, Nineveh, Iraq
- Discovered by: Hormuzd Rassam
- Present location: London, England, United Kingdom

The Assyrian statue (British Museum number 124963) was originally set up near the temple of Ishtar in Nineveh (near the modern city of Mosul in northern Iraq). The statue remains the only known Assyrian statue of a naked woman. The inscription shows it was intended "for titillation" or "to be alluring", and may represent an attendant of Ishtar, or Ishtar herself in her role as the goddess of love. The statue was first dated by E. A. Wallis Budge as being c. 1080 BCE.

== Description ==
This is a limestone carved statue of a woman. The statue is just smaller than life-size at 97 centimetres (38 in) high and 47 centimetres (19 in) wide at the shoulders and narrows to 28 centimetres (11 in) wide at the waist. There is a cuneiform inscription on the back of the statue which states that king Ashur-bel-kala erected it for the people.

Most of the surface detail has been lost, but the details of the pubic hair remain visible and carefully carved. When exhibited in a British Museum exhibition in 2018/19, the curators described it as deliberately unattractive in terms of Assyrian ideas of female beauty, and perhaps designed to insult some specific female figure. However, the museum website entry does not adopt this interpretation.

The statue was discovered and excavated by Hormuzd Rassam in 1853. It was found close to the Broken Obelisk (BM 118898 ) and "in the same ditch".

The statue is on permanent exhibition in the British Museum gallery 55, the Assyrian room, where it is simply labelled as "Limestone statue of a woman" and is dated as within the reign of Ashur-bel-kala.

=== Inscription ===
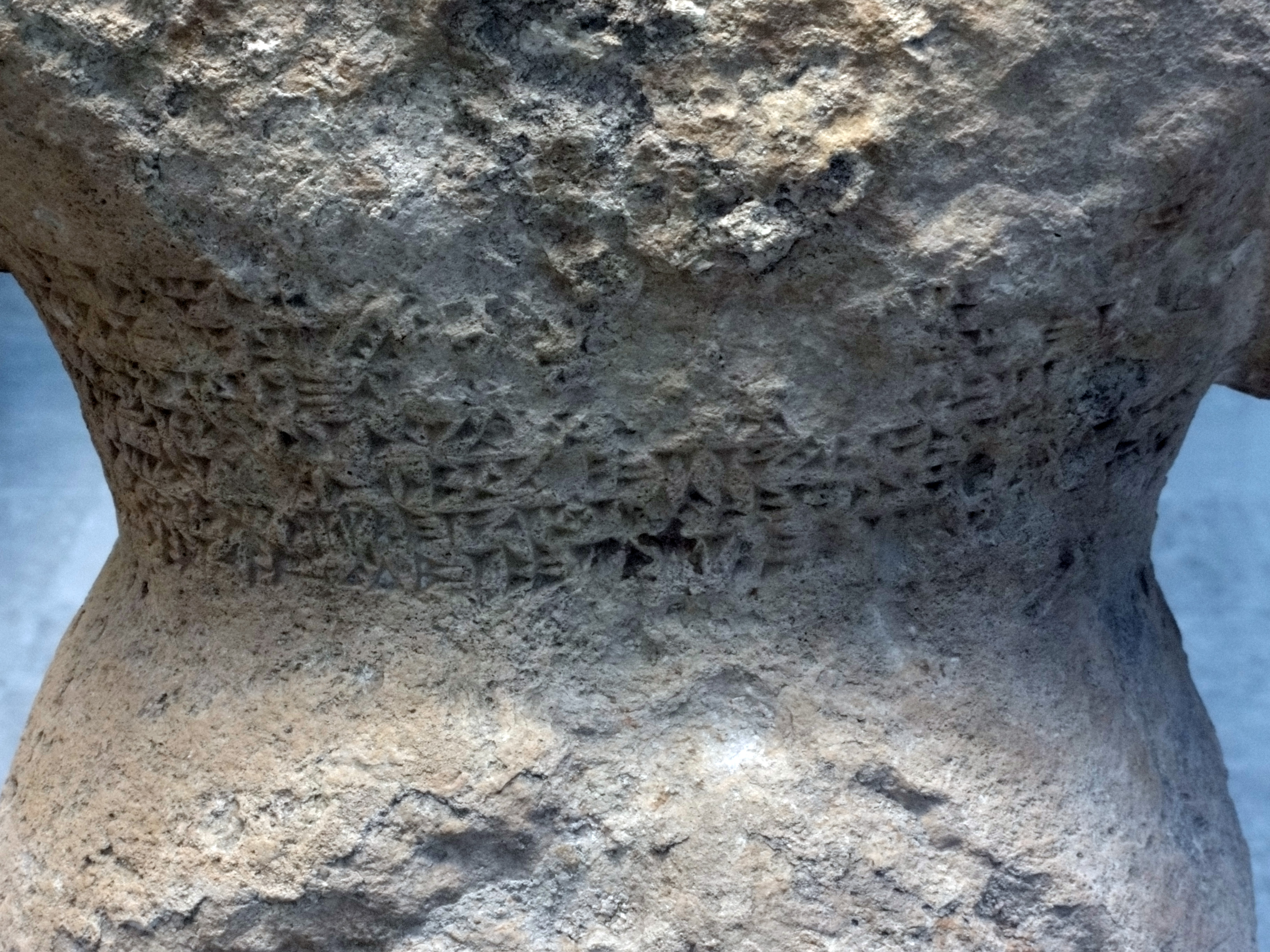
Detail showing cuneiform inscription on rear waist of statue.

Cuneiform transcription by Budge, 1902.

Budge's 1902 English translation was:

1. The palace of Ashur-bel-[kala, the king of hosts, the mighty king, the king of As]Syria,
2. the son of Tiglath-pileser, the king [of hosts], the mighty [king, the king of Assyria],
3. the son of Ashur-resh-ishi, the king of hosts, [the mighty king, the king of] Assyria.
4. These ... [among the rulers] of cities
5. and ... upon ... [have I ... ].
6. Whosoever shall alter my inscription or my name (which is written therein), may the god Za[..] and the gods
7. of the land of Martu smite him with ... smiting!

A more complete translation by Albert Kirk Grayson in 1991 reads:

(Property of) the palace of Assur-bel-[kala, king of the universe, strong king, king of As]syria, son of Tiglath-pile- ser (I), king of [the universe], strong [king, king of Assyria], son of Assur-resa-isi (I) (who was) also king of the universe, [strong king, king of] Assyria: I made these sculptures in the provinces, cities and garrisons for titillation. As for the one who removes my inscriptions and my name: the divine Sibitti, the gods of the west, will afflict him with snake-bite.
