= Tigris tunnel =

Cave in Turkey

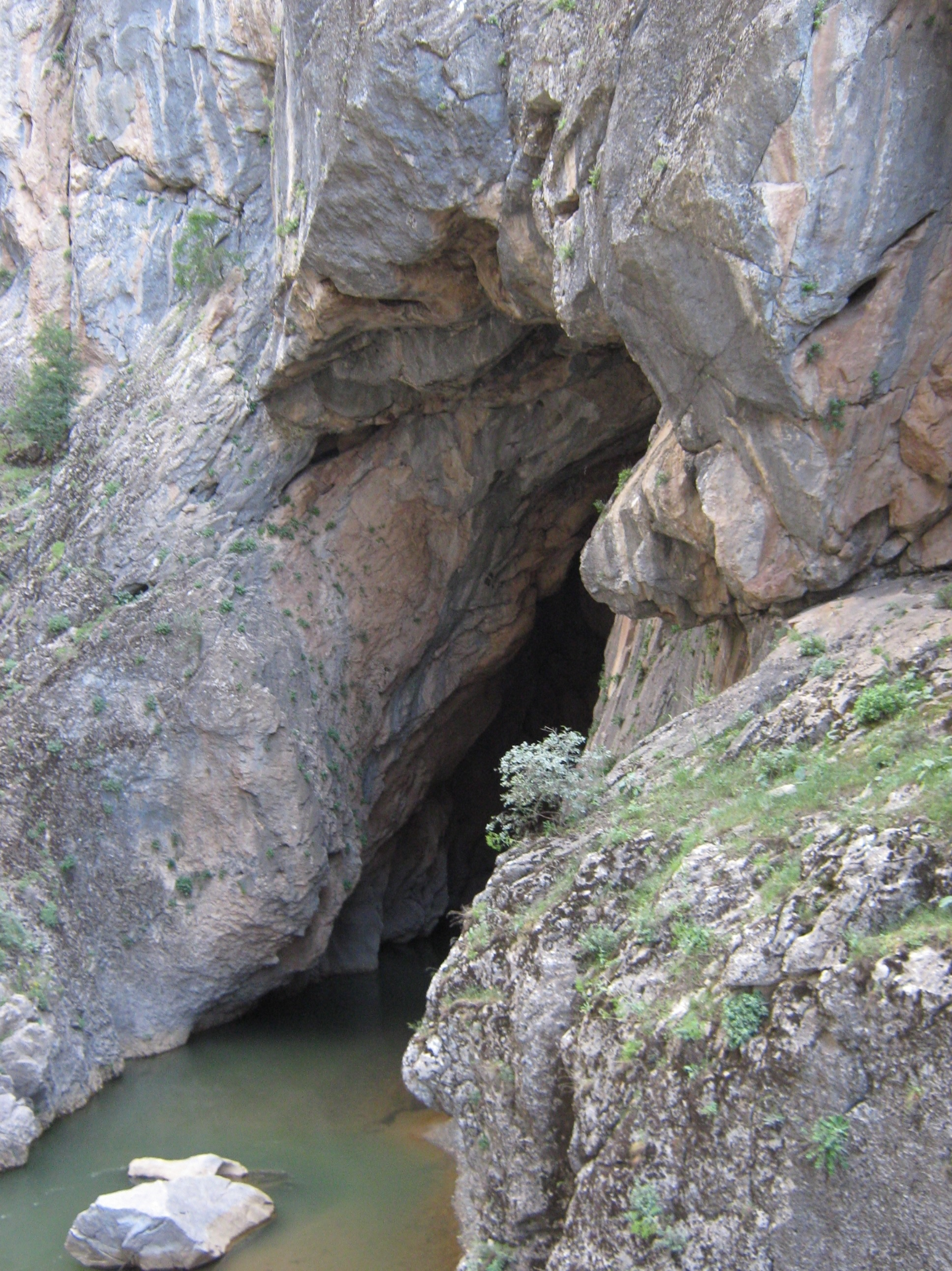
- exit of the Tigris tunnel

- Location within Turkey
- 38°31′47″N 40°32′51″E
- Region: Diyarbakır Province, Turkey

The so-called Tigris tunnel is a cave approximately 50 miles north of Diyarbakır in Turkey. It has a length of about 750 m (2,461 ft). The Berkilin Cay flows through this cave. It forms a source of the Tigris, but not the main one, although the exit was long believed to be this. In fact, the spring is near Bingöl not far away from the Tigris tunnel. In its vicinity there are several archaeological monuments, three Assyrian Empire and Neo-Assyrian rock reliefs and five inscriptions.

Best preserved are the rock reliefs of Tiglath-Pileser I and Shalmaneser III that are carved into the wall of the Tigris tunnel. Their production in 852 BC is shown in the relief of the bronze door bands of the Balawat Gates, now in the British Museum. Above the Tunnel there is a natural rock arch that is connected to the tunnel by a stairway created by the Urartians. Above the exit of the Tunnel there are further caves. The biggest of them bears a badly preserved relief and inscription of Shalmaneser III.

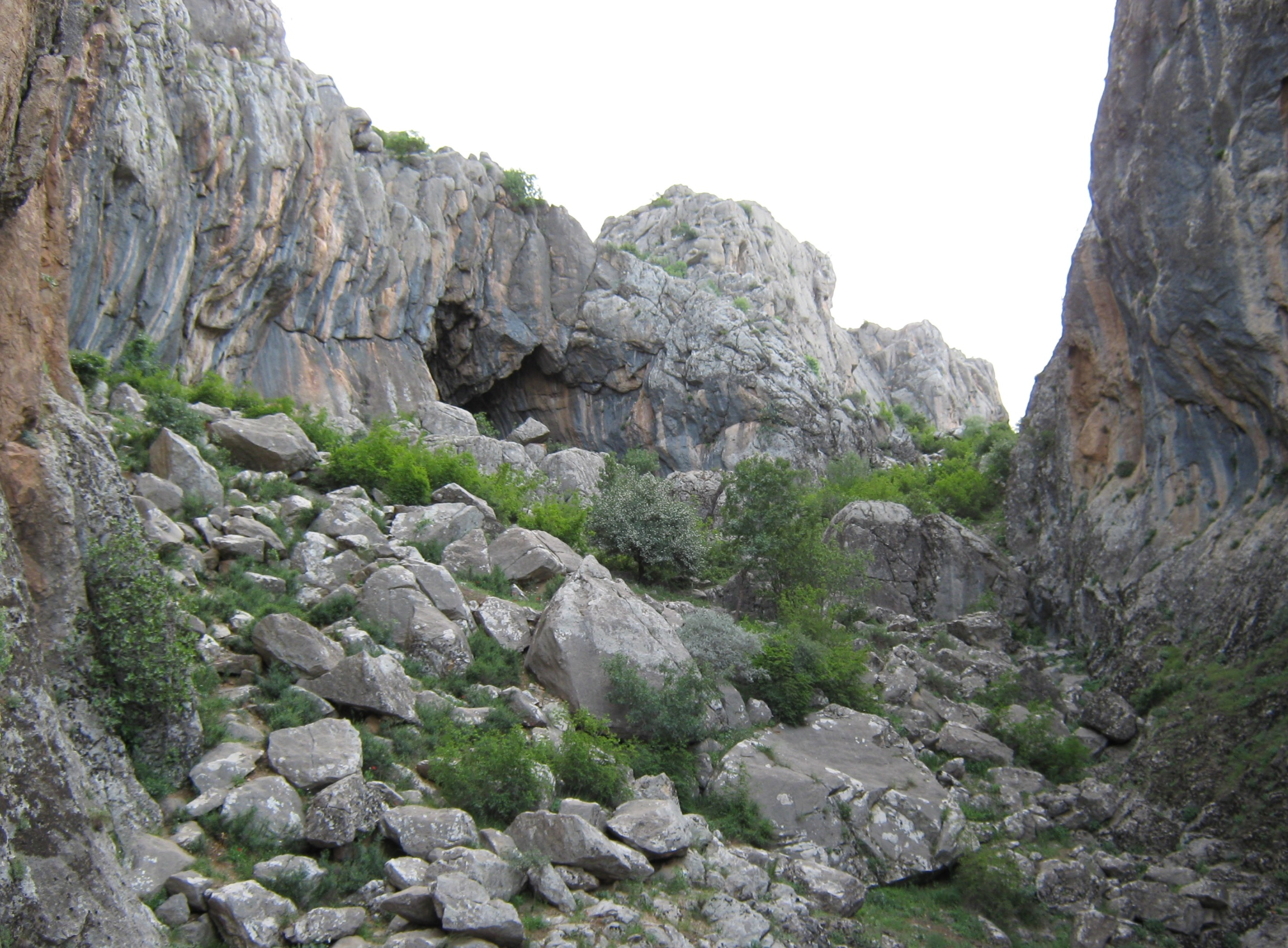
Cave above the tunnel exit

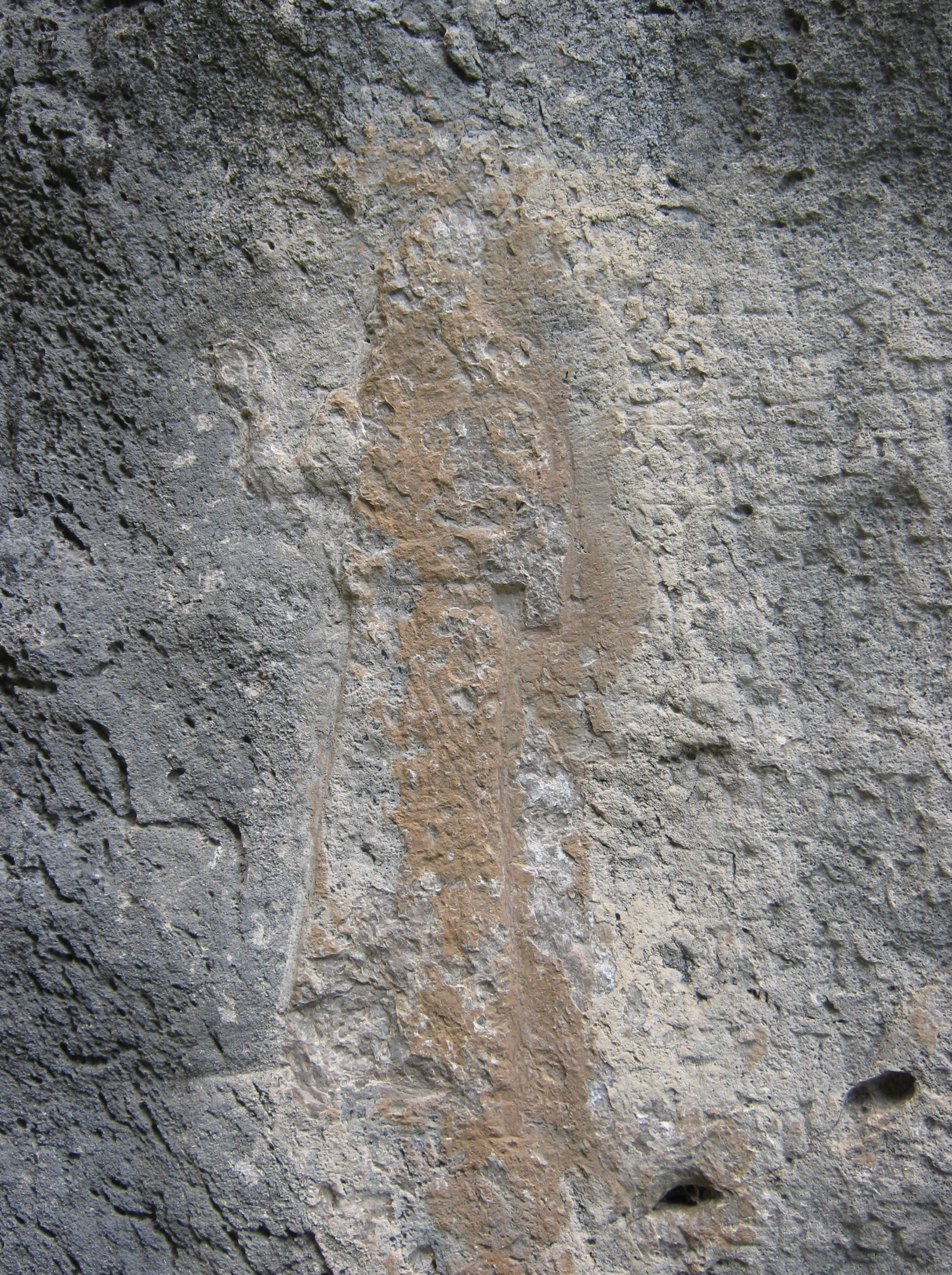
Relief of Shalmaneser III

== Sources ==
- Kreppner, Florian Janoscha, "Public Space in Nature: The Case of Neo-Assyrian Rock-Reliefs", Altorientalische Forschungen, 29/2 (2002): 367-383, online at Academia.edu
- Andreas Schachner (2009): Assyriens Könige an einer der Quellen des Tigris. Archäologische Forschungen im Höhlensystem des sogenannten Tigris-Tunnels. Tübingen.
