= Nirgul tablet =

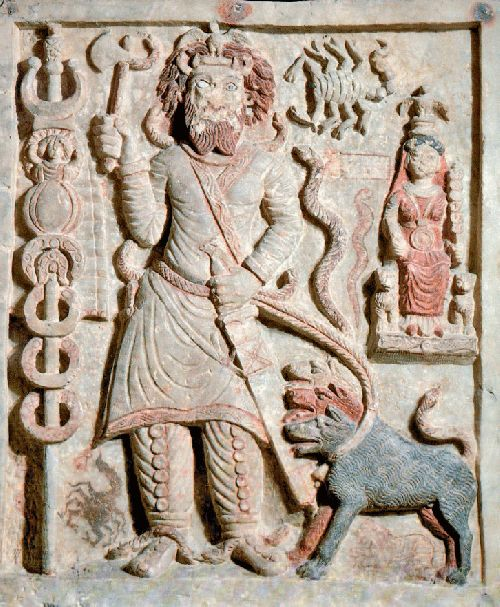
The Nirgul tablet

The Nirgul tablet (also known as The Kerberos Relief or The Relief Image of Hades) is an ancient Mesopotamian relief carving of the deity Nergal found in the city of Hatra in Iraq, dating to the first or second century AD.

The tablet was recovered from a room in the First Temple at the site where it had been encased in a wall. Alongside the figure of Nirgul, a seated female figure is thought to depict the goddess Al-Lat.

The tablet was destroyed in May 2015, by Islamic State militants, when they ransacked the Mosul Museum. Subsequently the tablet was digitally recreated using photogrammetry and various photographs as part of Project Mosul.

== See also ==
- Destruction of cultural heritage by ISIL
