= Balawat Gates =

Three sets of gates

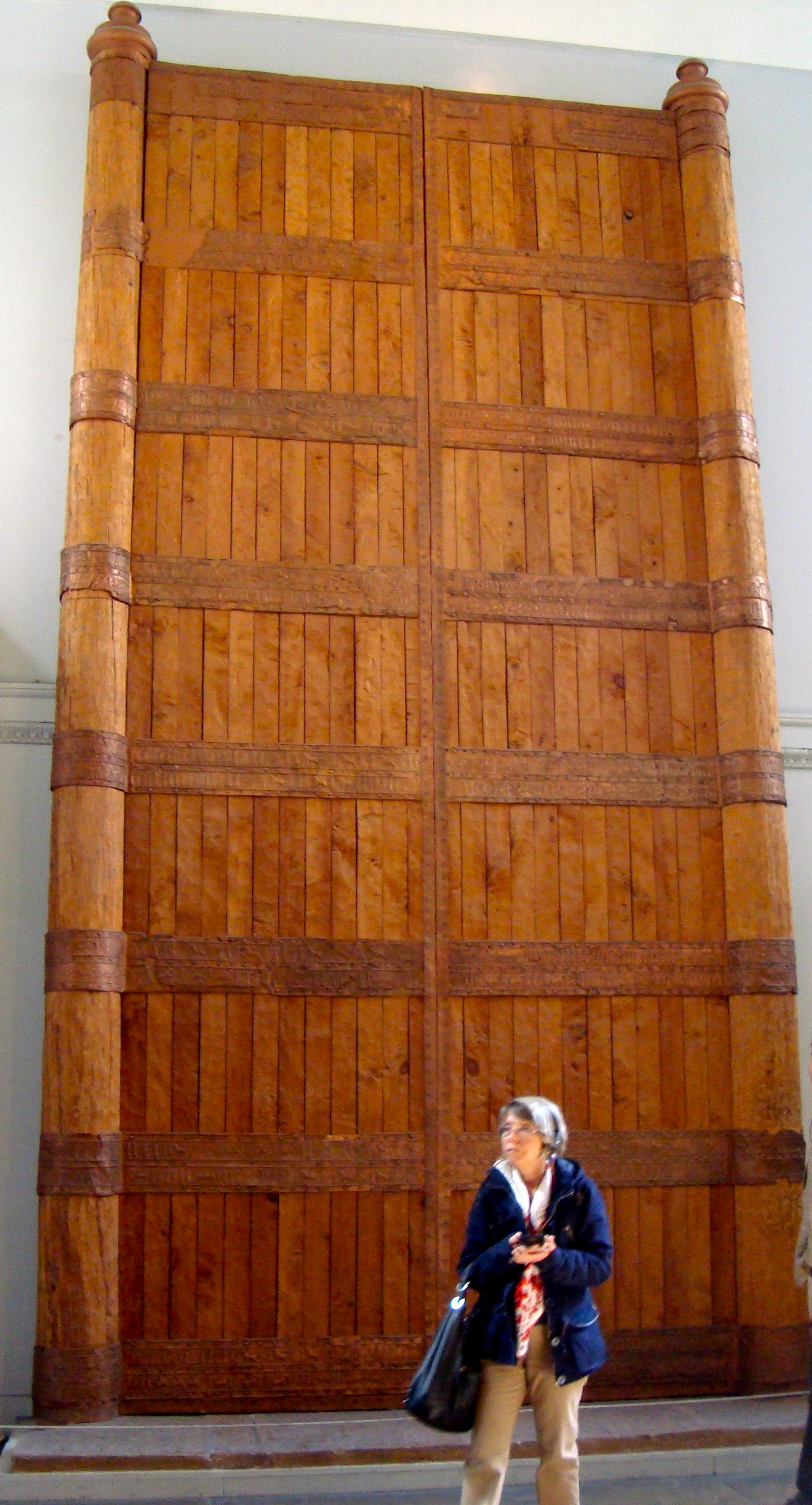
- Full-size replica in the British Museum (top) and smaller gate in the Istanbul museum (bottom)

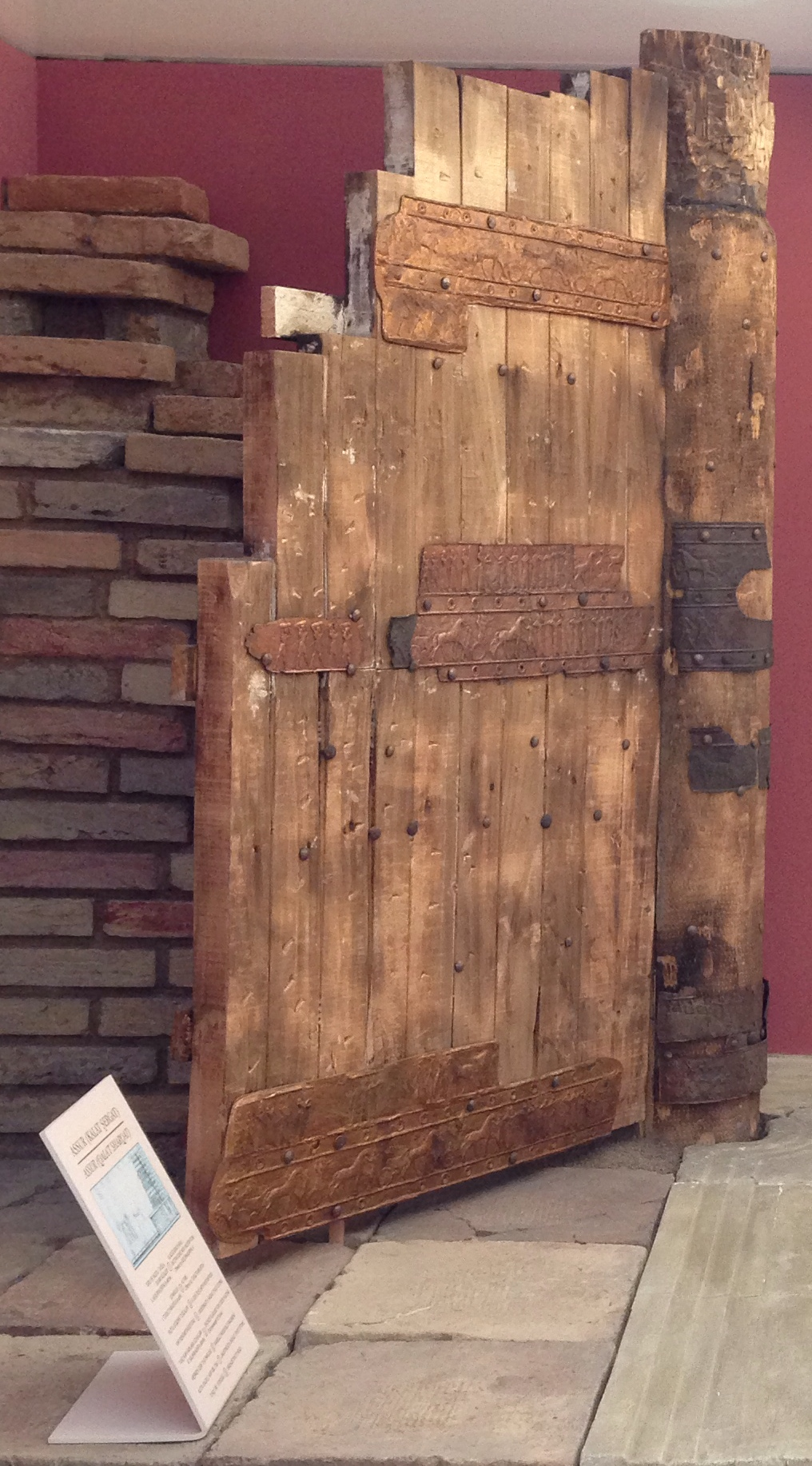
- Material: Bronze and wood
- Created: c.860 BCE
- Discovered: 1878
- Present location: British Museum, Walters Art Museum, Istanbul Archaeology Museums and Mosul Museum

The Balawat Gates are three sets of decorated bronze bands that had adorned the main doors of several buildings at Balawat (ancient Imgur-Enlil), dating to the reigns of Ashurnasirpal II (r. 883–859 BC) and Shalmaneser III (r. 859–824 BC). Their extensive use of narrative art depicting the exploits of Assyrian kings has cemented their position as some of the most important surviving works of art of the Neo-Assyrian Empire, comparable to the extensive Assyrian palace reliefs. When the Neo-Assyrian Empire fell in 614-612 BC, Balawat was destroyed. The wooden elements of the gates decomposed, leaving only the bronze bands (some of which were badly damaged). The remains of two sets of gates can be found in the British Museum's collection, those from the Temple of Mamu are housed in the Mosul Museum. Small sections of the Shalmaneser bronze door bands are also in the Louvre Museum at the Walters Art Museum in Baltimore and in the Istanbul Archaeology Museums.

== Description ==
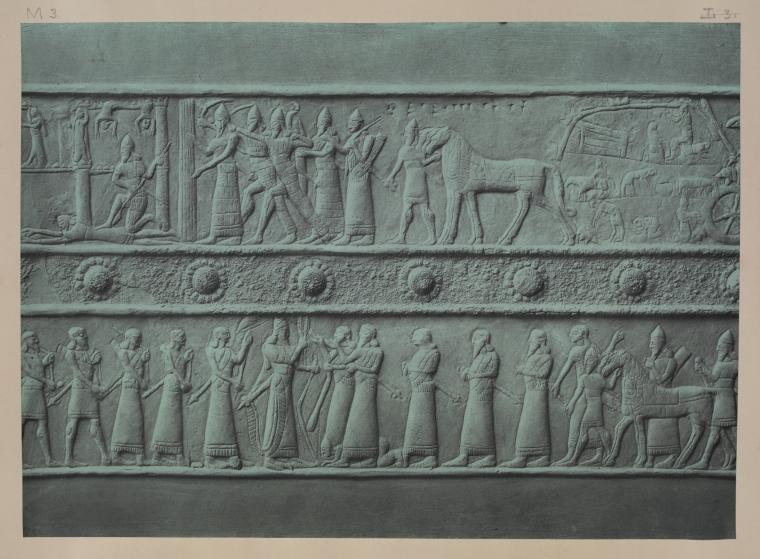
Capture of Astamaku, near Al-Mastumah, described on the gates

Contemporary inscriptions suggest that the gates at Balawat near Nimrud were made of cedar. They were not hinged as they opened by turning massive pine pillars which were decorated with bronze and turned in stone sockets. Archaeologists believe that the gates were originally 6.8 m (22 ft) high and these estimates have been used to create full size reconstructions of the gates at the British Museum. The gates in the British Museum were discovered in 1878 by local archaeologist Hormuzd Rassam. Rassam was the first Assyrian archaeologist. By the time of their discovery the wood had already rotted away and only remnants of the decorated bronze bands remained. The eight bands on each door would have been over 285 feet long in total and they decorated and strengthened the outer face and door post of each door. 265 feet of the bands are in the British Museum whilst 2 feet are at the Walters Museum in Baltimore. The variety of the images gives archaeologists an insight into the life, technology and civilisation at that time. The pictorial information is supplemented by inscriptions which give further information.

The bands describe an important religious discovery in 852 BCE when King Shalmaneser III found the source of the River Tigris at the Tigris tunnel. This was a very important event because the rivers were thought to be deities. The pictures also show the workmen carving walls to represent their King in the way that he would approve. Carvings can still be seen in East Turkey of markings made by Shalamaneser's workers to the south west of Lake Van. Possibly the most important pictures are the ground plans of nearby buildings as these restored the reputation of Rassam who discovered the gates. Following the gates discovery there was a lot of debate about whether these gates were found here and whether Rassam had given an accurate account. It was argued that these were an important find in a minor place and these gates must have come from a more important nearby city like Nineveh. However excavations at the site have revealed that pictures on the gates agree with evidence on the ground which provides proof that the gates were indeed at Balawat, Balawat was important, the gates were here and Rassam had been telling the truth. Rassam felt that the credit for many of his other discoveries had been taken by senior British Museum staff.

In 1893 Rassam had sued the British Museum keeper E. A. Wallis Budge in the British courts for both slander and libel. Budge had written to the trustees of the museum saying that Rassam had used "his relatives" to smuggle antiquities out of Nineveh and had only sent "rubbish" to the British Museum. The elderly Rassam was upset by these accusations and when he challenged Budge he received a partial apology and retraction that the High court considered "insincere" and "ungentlemanly". Rassam took the matter to court and he was fully supported by the judge but not by the jury.

== Three sets of gates ==
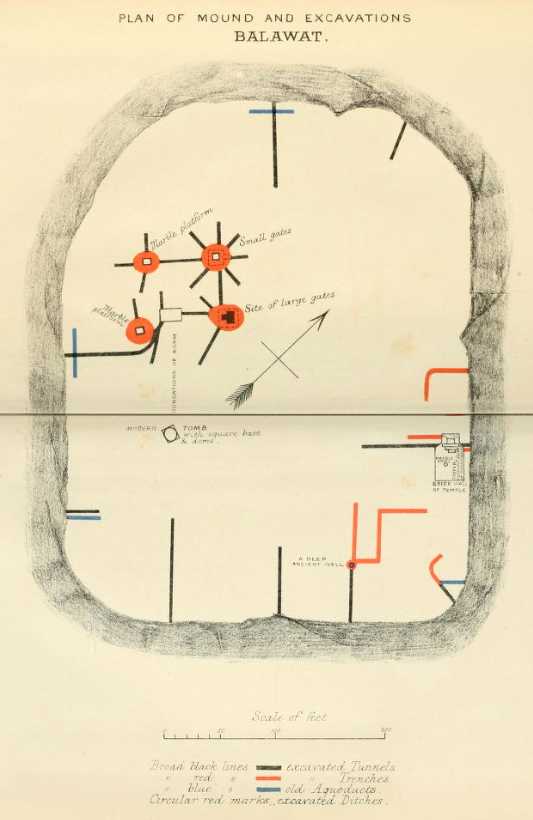
Balawat Excavation Plan 1882, showing the two sets of gates identified by Rassam

Two sets of Balawat Gates were commissioned in Ashurnasirpal II's reign and one set in his son, Shalmanser III's reign. The first set was discovered by Hormuzd Rassam in 1878 and now resides in the British Museum. Along with these gates, a limestone coffer was found containing two inscribed marble tablets of Ashurnasirpal II. The inscriptions on this coffer described the foundation of a temple equipped with bronze gates dedicated to Mamu, the Assyrian god of dreams. The second set of gates originated from the Temple of Mamu. These gates were excavated by Max Mallowan in 1956 and are now located in the Mosul Museum, though many pieces were looted in 2003. The third set of gates, which were set up by Ashurnasirpal II's son, Shalmaneser III, were discovered by Hormuzd Rassam in 1878. Shalmaneser III's gates are also located in the British Museum. The third set of gates were published in 1905. The gates belonging to Shalmaneser III were discovered at the small Assyrian site of Imgur-Enlil.

Some of the Balawat Bronze Bands at Mosul Museum survived the looting in the wake of the invasion of Iraq in 2003. Nevertheless, Destruction of Mosul Museum artifacts further occurred in 2015 because of a terrorist attack. Some of the details of the aftermath have been described based on a video.

The full documentation of all these Bronze Bands is available in a 2008 publication by the British Museum.

Eckhard Unger who was the curator of the Istanbul museum described the remains of Balawat gates that are still in the Istanbul Museums. Unger was fully aware that the major parts of the gates were in London and Paris and he was able to visit both locations and discuss them with the respective curators.

== Embossed scenes ==
The surviving pieces of all three sets of gates consist of long bands or strips of bronze, which were mounted on wooden doors. They were embossed and inlaid with chased decoration showing scenes of warfare, the presentation of tribute and the hunting of lions and bulls. Each pair of gates consisted of 16 bronze bands (8 each side). All of the bronze bands were arranged in a decorative scheme. The bronze edging strips on the doors were also inscribed. The gates commissioned by Ashurnasirpal II are decorated in single register with an embossed and engraved figurative scene on the top and the bottom, which are bordered with palmettes. Beyond these borders are a second pair of outer borders, which include decorative rosettes. The bronze bands covered both doors and the doorposts. Careful reconstruction of these gates demonstrates that the doorposts were tapered towards the top and the bands also reduced in size.

== Gallery ==
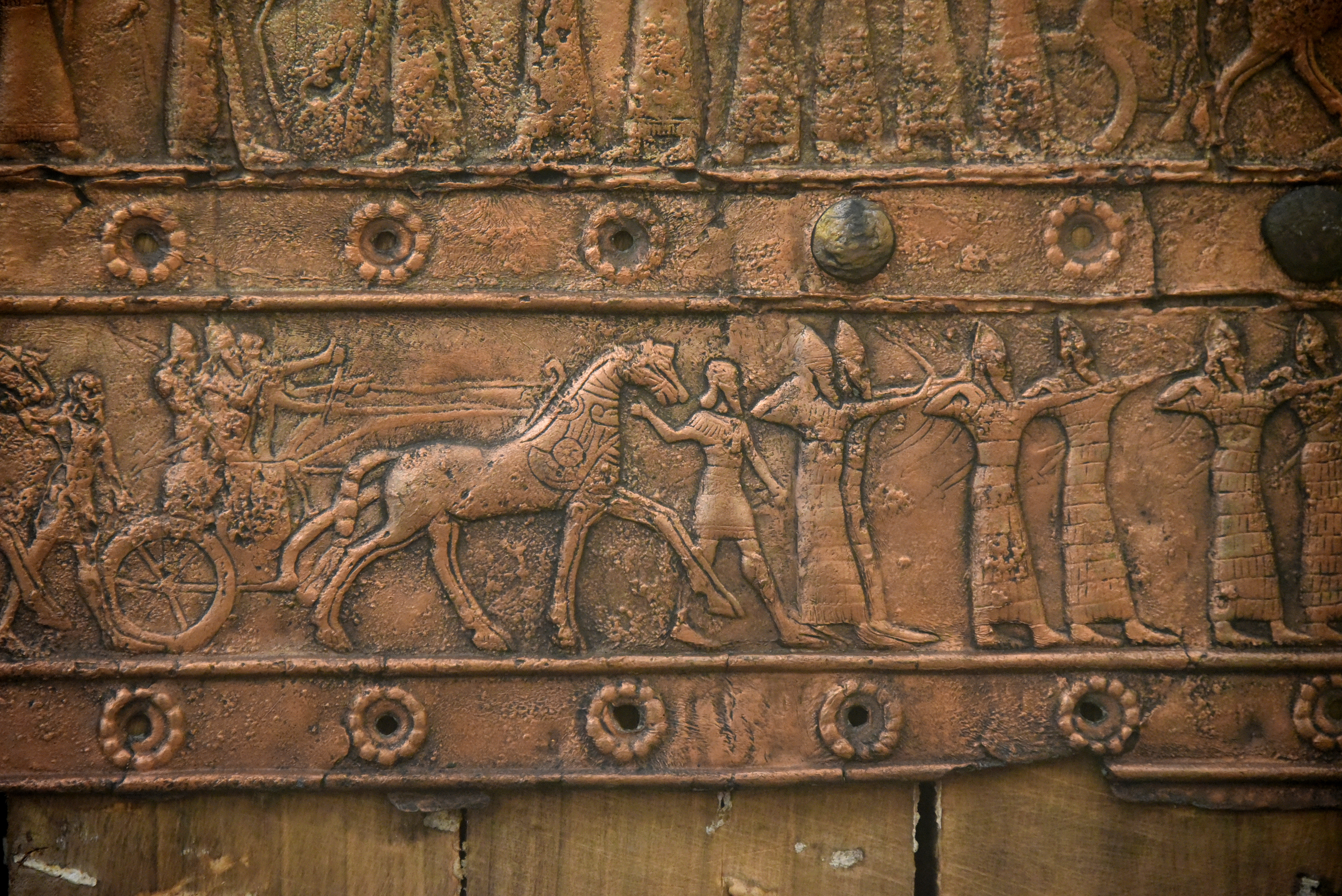
Detail of an embossed scene on bronze plate showing Shalmaneser III in a chariot and Assyrian archers. From a Balawat gate, Iraq, 859–824 BCE. Ancient Orient Museum, Istanbul

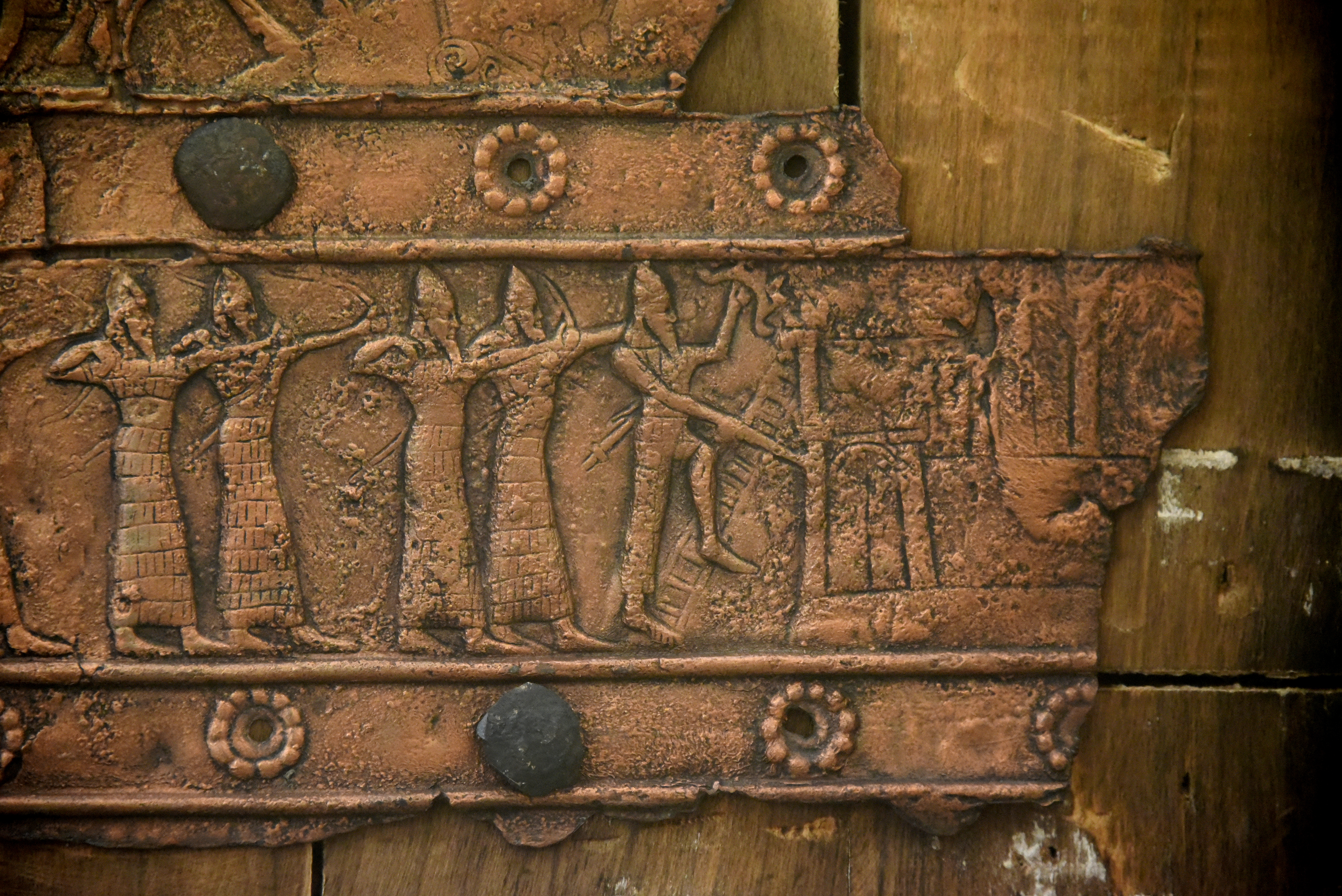
Detail of an embossed scene on bronze plate showing Assyrian army attacking a city. From a Balawat gate, Iraq, 859–824 BCE. Ancient Orient Museum, Istanbul

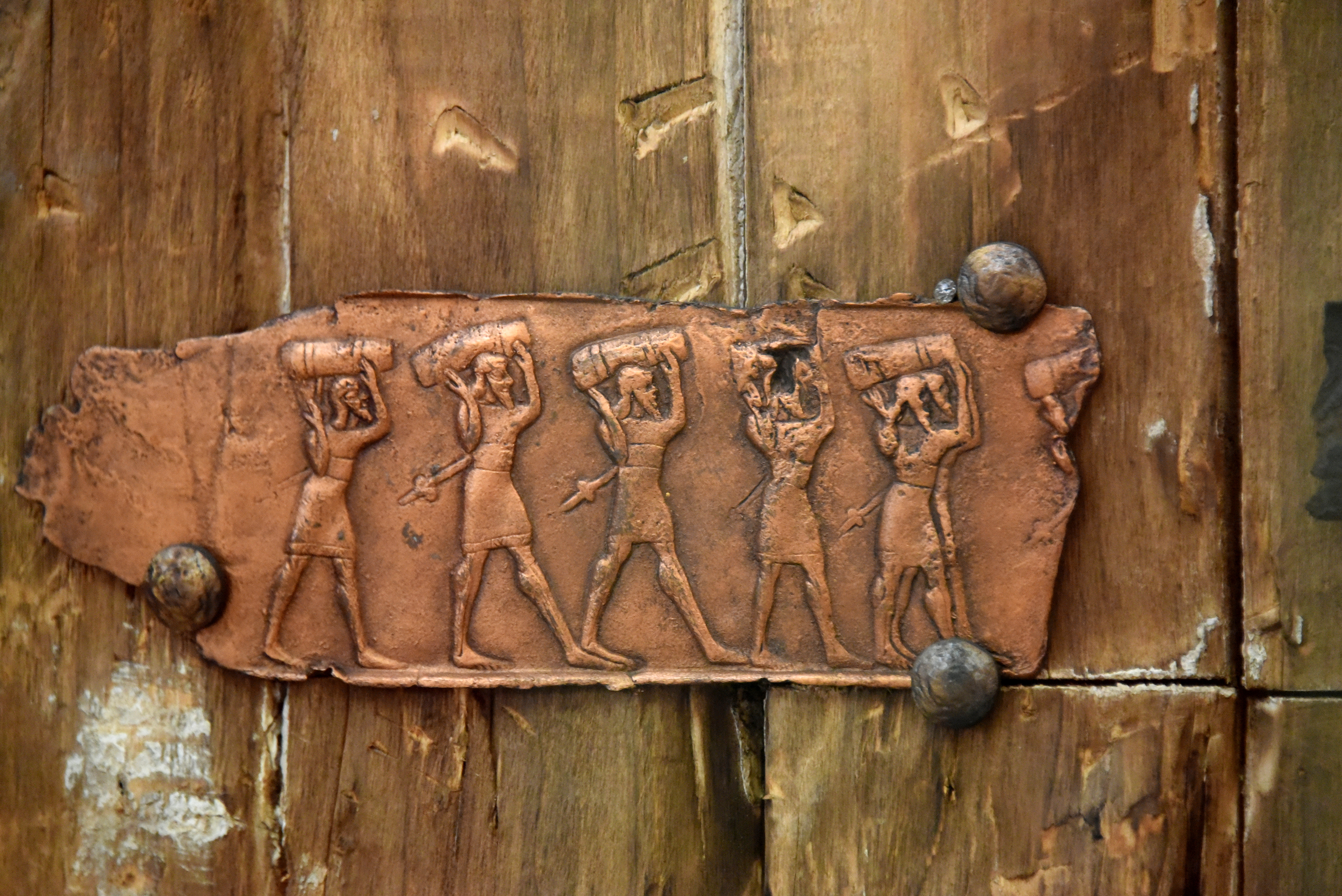
Detail of an embossed scene on bronze plate showing armed men carrying booty. From a Balawat gate, Iraq, 859–824 BCE. Ancient Orient Museum, Istanbul

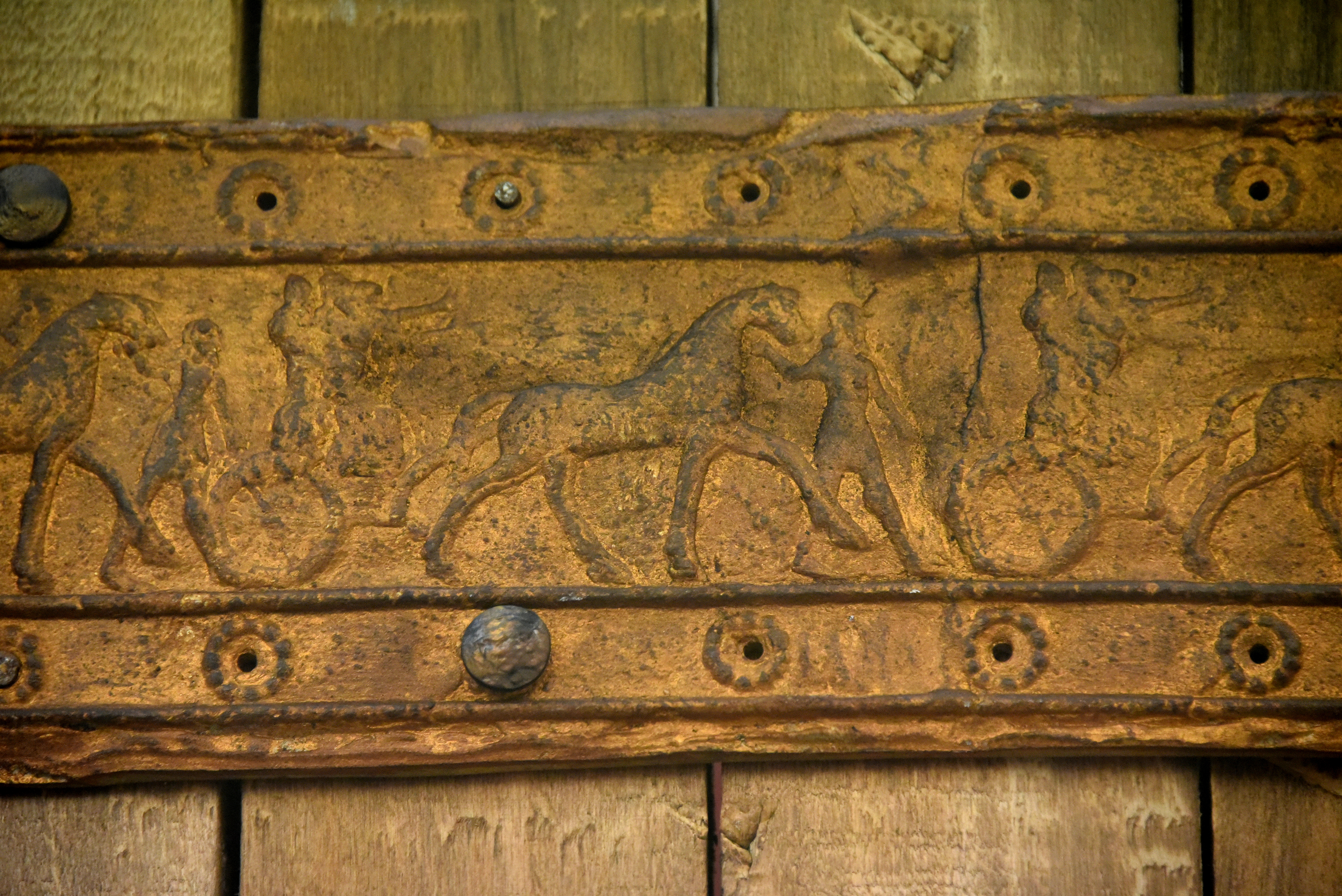
Detail of an embossed scene on bronze plate showing Assyrian war chariots. From a Balawat gate, Iraq, 859–824 BCE. Ancient Orient Museum, Istanbul

== See also ==
- al-Mastumah
