= Ashurnasirpal II =

Assyrian king from 883 to 859 BC

- King of Assyria; Glorious King of the Lands; King of the Four Corners of the World; King of All Peoples
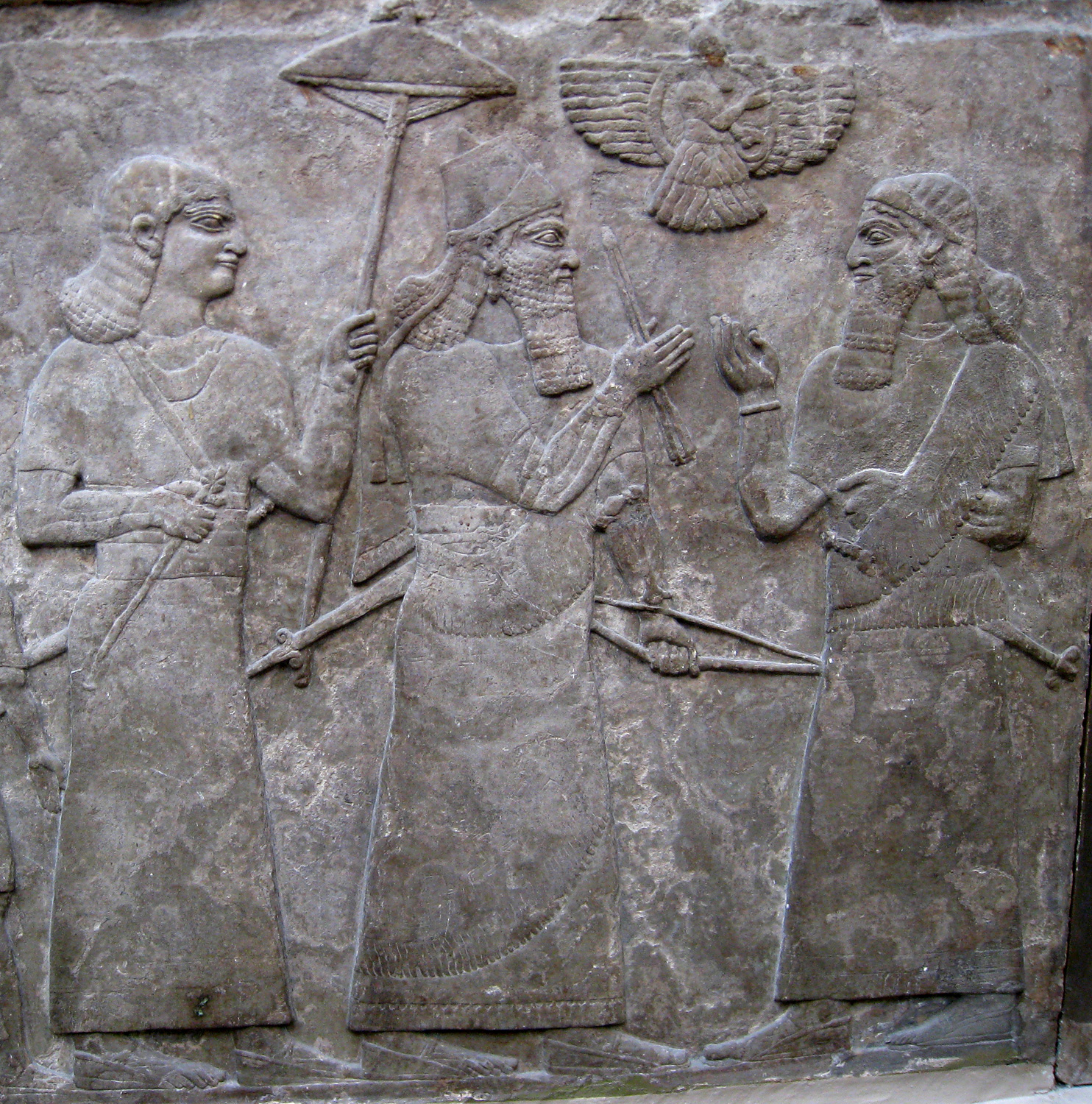
- Ashur-nasir-pal II (centre) meets a high official after a successful battle.

King of the Neo-Assyrian Empire
- Reign: 25 regnal years 883–859 BC
- Predecessor: Tukulti-Ninurta II
- Successor: Shalmaneser III
- Born: 910 BC
- Died: 859 BC
- Spouse: Mullissu-mukannishat-Ninua
- Father: Tukulti-Ninurta II

Ashur-nasir-pal II (transliteration: Aššur-nāṣir-apli, meaning "Ashur is guardian of the heir") was the third king of the Neo-Assyrian Empire from 883 to 859 BC. Ashurnasirpal II succeeded his father, Tukulti-Ninurta II. His son and successor was Shalmaneser III and his queen was Mullissu-mukannišat-Ninua.

== Reign ==
During his reign he embarked on a vast program of expansion, first conquering the peoples to the north in Asia Minor as far as Nairi and exacting tribute from Phrygia, then invading Aram (modern Syria) conquering the Aramaeans and Neo-Hittites between the Khabur and the Euphrates Rivers. The palaces, temples and other buildings he raised bear witness to considerable development in wealth and art. He installed Assyrian governors, rather than depending on local client rulers paying tribute.

== Cruelty ==
Ashurnasirpal II was notorious for his brutality, using enslaved captives to build a new Assyrian capital at Kalhu (Nimrud) in Mesopotamia.

His harshness prompted a revolt that he crushed decisively in a pitched, two-day battle. According to his monument inscription, while recalling this massacre he says:

Their men young and old I took prisoners. Of some I cut off their feet and hands; of others I cut off the ears noses and lips; of the young men's ears I made a heap; of the old men's heads I made a minaret. I exposed their heads as a trophy in front of their city. The male children and the female children I burned in flames; the city I destroyed, and consumed with fire.

Following this victory, he advanced without opposition as far as the Mediterranean and exacted tribute from Phoenicia. On his return home, he moved his capital to the city of Kalhu (Nimrud).

== Campaigns ==
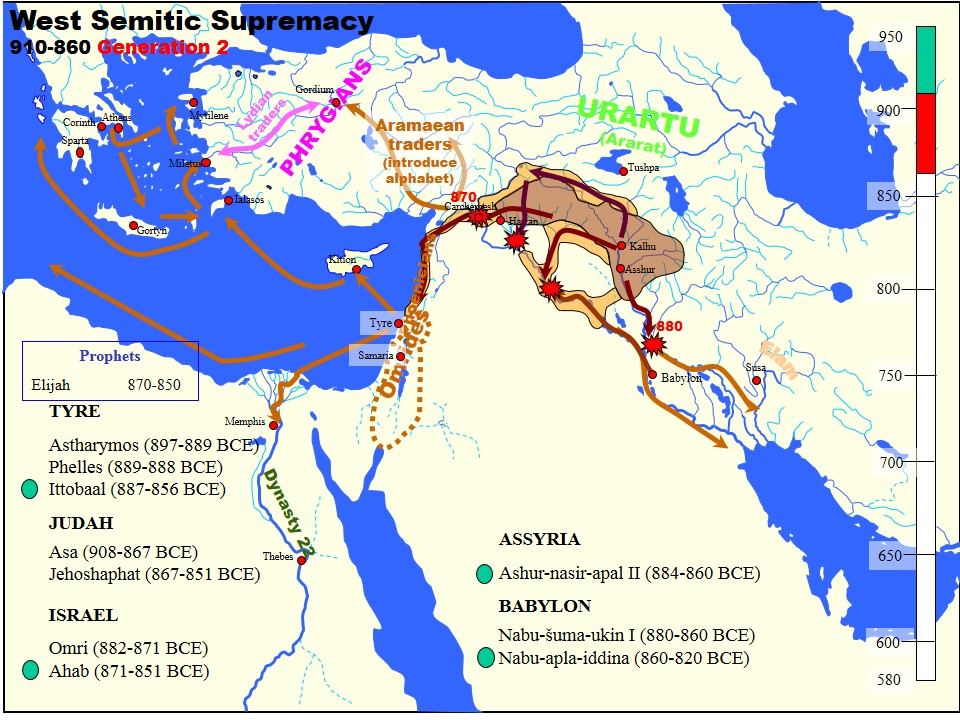
Campaigns and contemporaries of Ashurnasirpal II

Like previous Assyrian monarchs, Ashurnasirpal campaigned along the Euphrates against Aramaeans and in the Diyala against Babylon. Ashurnasirpal II's brutal treatment of rebels ensured that even when his army was not present, there would not be further revolts. Further revolts saw the local monarch replaced with a governor, loyal only to the Assyrian monarchy. Leading his army, which was typically composed of infantry (including auxiliaries and foreigners), heavy cavalry, light cavalry and chariots, Ashurnasirpal conquered the Hittites and Aramaean states of northern Syria.

Ashurnasirpal II did not destroy the Phoenician/Canaanite cities he conquered. He was unsuccessful in his siege of Tyre, which under Ittobaal settled Kition in Cyprus and opened up trade routes throughout the Aegean, at Rhodes and Miletus. Through tribute they became sources for the raw materials of his armies and his building programs. Iron was needed for weapons, Lebanese cedar for construction and gold and silver for the payment of troops.

When considering the occupied citizens of his conquered territories, he wrote:

I resettled them in their abandoned towns and houses. I imposed more tribute and tax on them than ever before: horses, mules, oxen, sheep, wine and labor.

== Balawat Gates ==
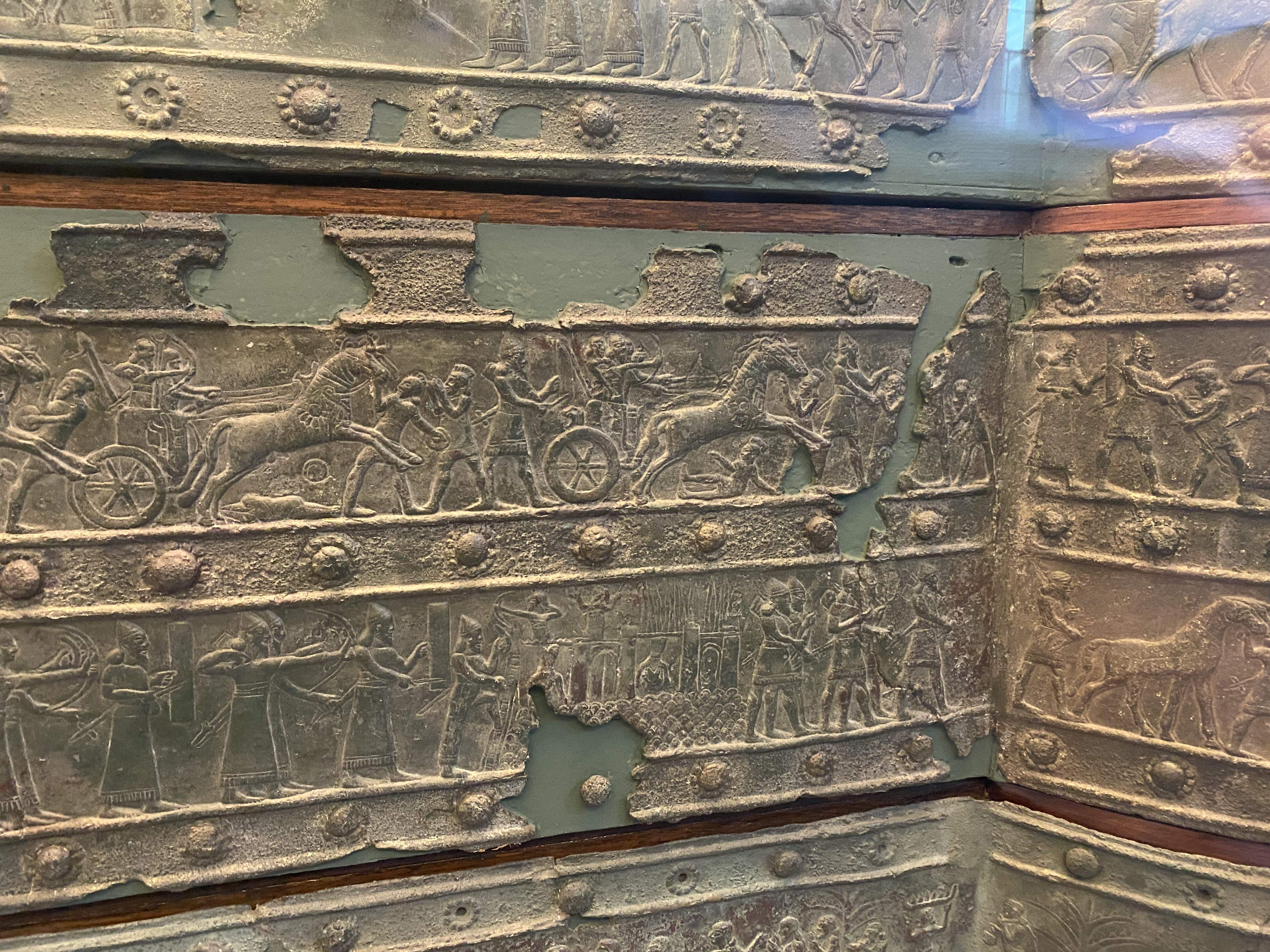
Engravings of the brass gates of Balawat, dating back to the reign of King Ashurnasirpal II, 883-859 BC, British Museum

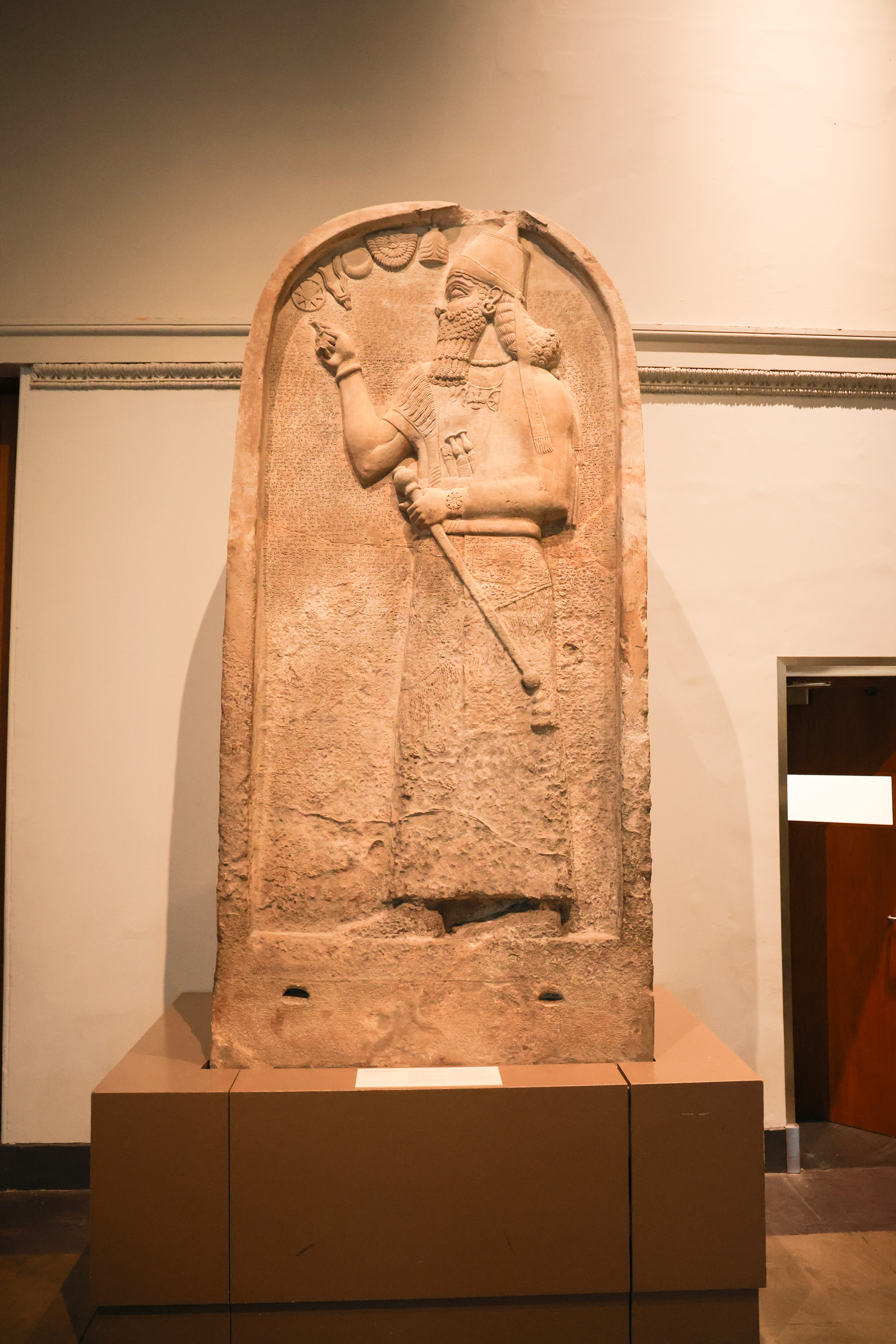
Limestone stela of Ashurnasirpal II in the British Museum

The Balawat Gates, or the Balawat Bronze Bands are three sets of decorated bronze bands that had adorned the main doors of several buildings at Balawat (ancient Imgur-Enlil). Two of them date to the reign of Ashurnasirpal II. The third set of the Bronze Bands depicts the exploits of his son Shalmaneser III.

After the Neo-Assyrian Empire fell and Balawat was destroyed, the wooden elements of the gates decomposed. Most of the bronze bands survive, and can be found in museums. The gates were originally 6.8 metres high.

The gates were first discovered by the Iraqi archaeologist Hormuzd Rassam on a British Museum expedition in 1878. They were found in the doorway of the king's palace. That set of the Balawat Bronze Bands is now on permanent display in London. The second set of the Bands was excavated by Sir Max Mallowan in 1956 in the Temple of Mamu, the Mesopotamian goddess associated with dreams. It was on display in the Mosul Museum in Iraq, but is now largely missing because of the looting in the wake of the invasion of Iraq in 2003. The documentation of these Bands is available in a 2008 publication by the British Museum. Destruction of Mosul Museum artifacts further occurred in 2015 because of a terrorist attack.

These sets include 32 bands of figurative scenes embossed on bronze, including cuneiform inscriptions. They provide a wealth of historical and art-historical information about the ninth century BC Assyria and surrounding region.

== Palace of Kalhu ==
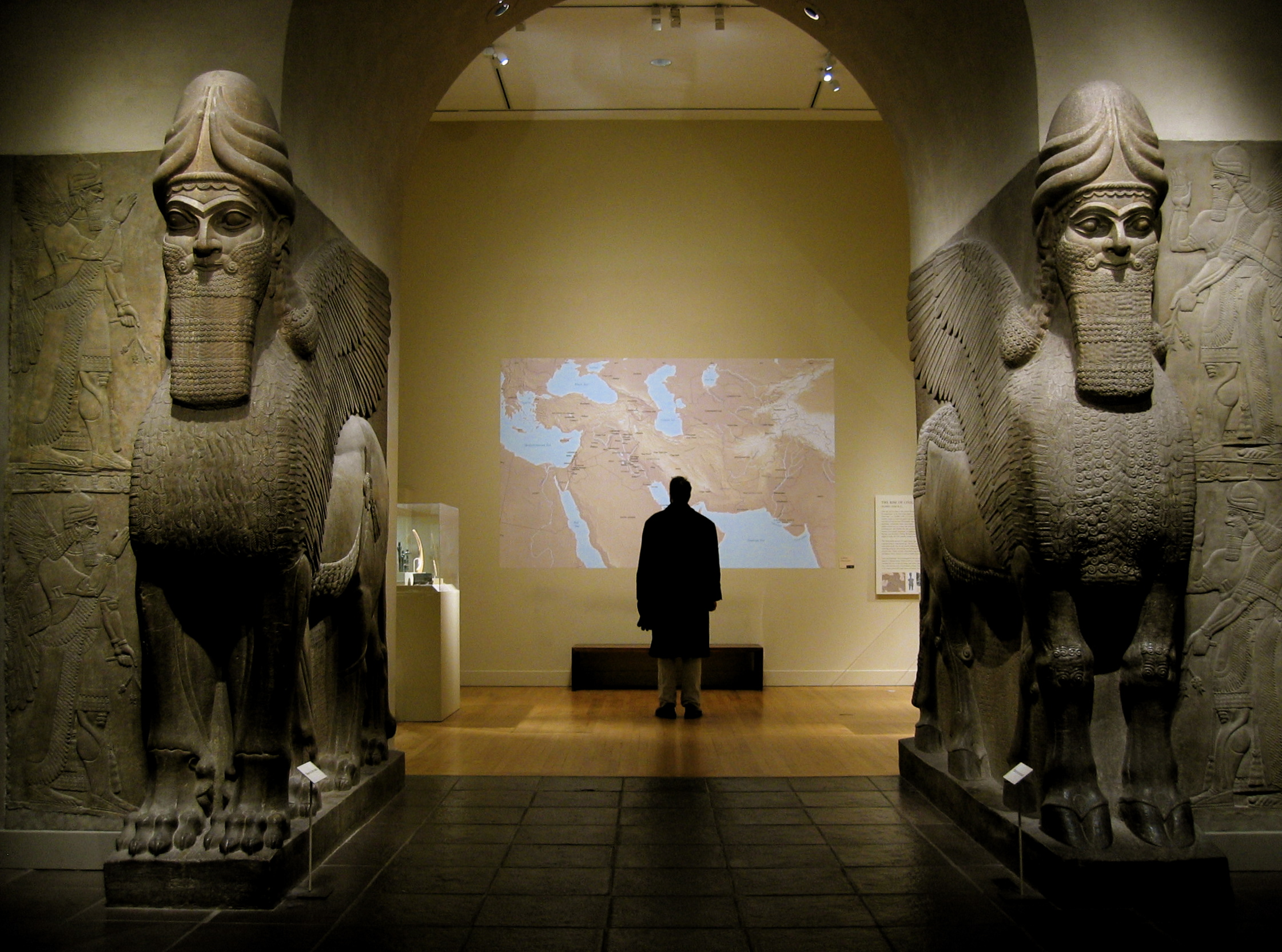
A pair of Lamassus, Nimrud, at the Metropolitan Museum of Art

Ashurnasirpal II's palace in Kalhu (Nimrud, which is in modern-day Iraq slightly south of Mosul) probably began construction c.878 BC, and is now generally accepted as having been completed after around 15 years alongside the near-total reconstruction of the Middle Assyrian city, c.864 BC. An inscription describing its inauguration details a ten-day banquet which 69,574 people attended. The palace walls were lined with reliefs carved in alabaster. These reliefs bore elaborate carvings, many portraying the king surrounded by winged protective spirits, or engaged in hunting or on campaign.

Each relief had text inscribed in it. This text was the same or very similar on each relief and is therefore called the Standard Inscription. The Standard Inscription begins by tracing Ashur-nasir-pal II's lineage back three generations and recounts his military victories, defines the boundaries of his empire, tells how he founded Kalhu, and built the palace. Ashurnasirpal II also built a massive gateway at Nimrud.

The British archaeologist Austen Henry Layard excavated Kalhu in the 1840s, uncovering the North-West Palace of Ashurnasirpal II. Today, many of the reliefs and sculptures from the excavations in Nimrud are displayed in the galleries of the British Museum, London, including the Statue of Ashurnasirpal II and the Black Obelisk by his son Shalmaneser III, with other reliefs on display in museums in Europe (e.g. Munich), Japan and the USA.

== Nimrud reliefs ==
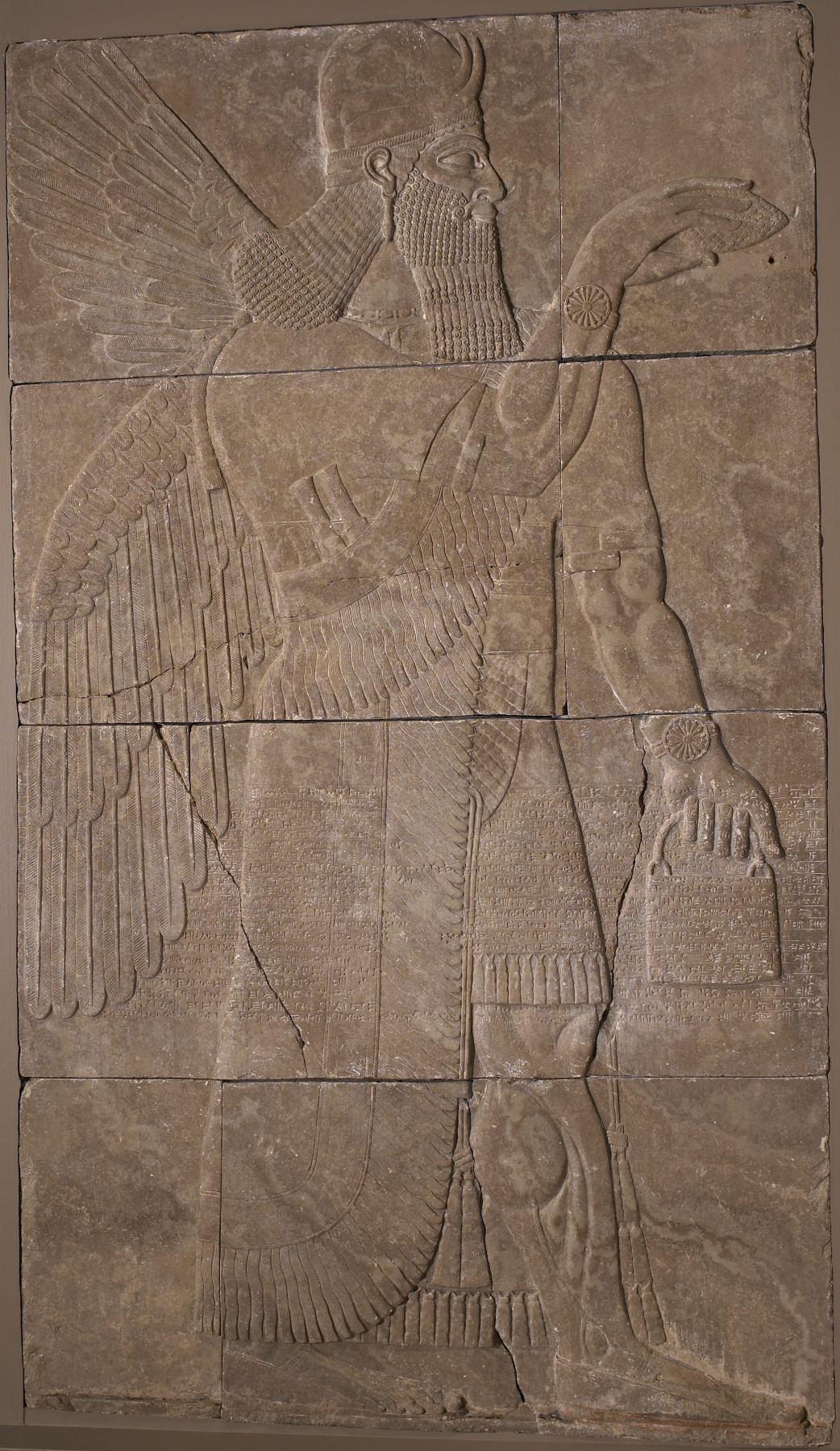
On this relief from Nimrud, a winged benevolent spirit blesses either the king or palace with a pine-cone. Walters Art Museum, Baltimore.

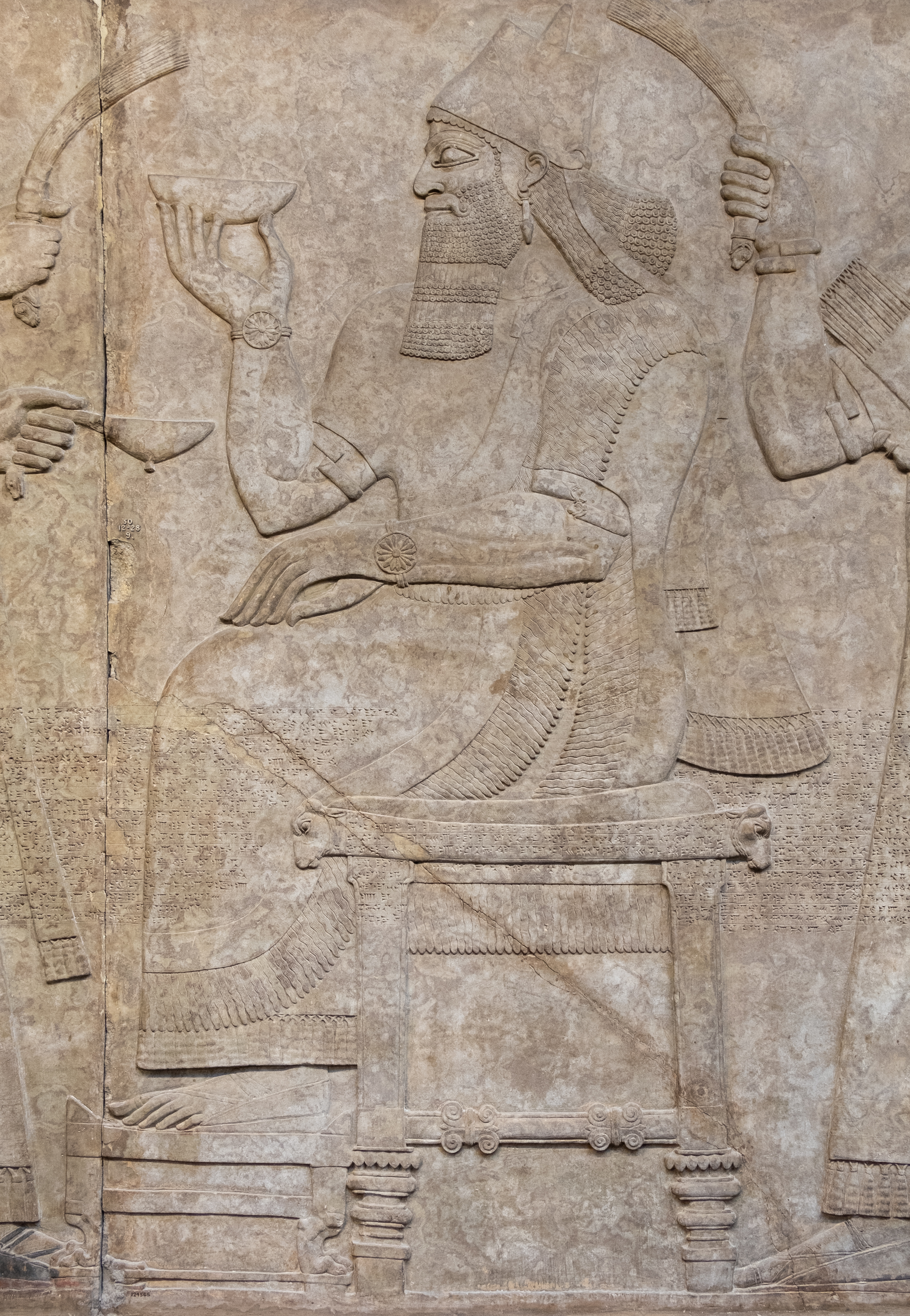
Ashurnasirpal on the throne

After Assyria fell in 612 BC, the palace became overgrown and eventually completely buried, in which state it remained for nearly 2,500 years until rediscovered by the British-born Austen Henry Layard in 1845. Layard oversaw the excavation of the palace during which time the reliefs that dominated the walls of the structure were removed from the site and sent to collections throughout Europe and North America, with the British Museum receiving the majority of these Nimrud reliefs. Despite excavating and removing many of these reliefs, a great number remained within the palace and were eventually reburied with time.

Max Mallowan re-excavated the site from 1947 until 1957, when the project was taken over by the Iraq Department of Antiques which still has legal authority over the site. The known area of the palace measures 200m from north to south and 120 meters from east to west. This is most likely only a portion of the original design, including the possibility of an upper level while no concrete evidence of this remains. All of the walls of the palace were lined with stone slabs of which a majority were decorated with relief images.

Nimrud Relief:Ashurnasirpal II Hunting Lions, 883–859 BC

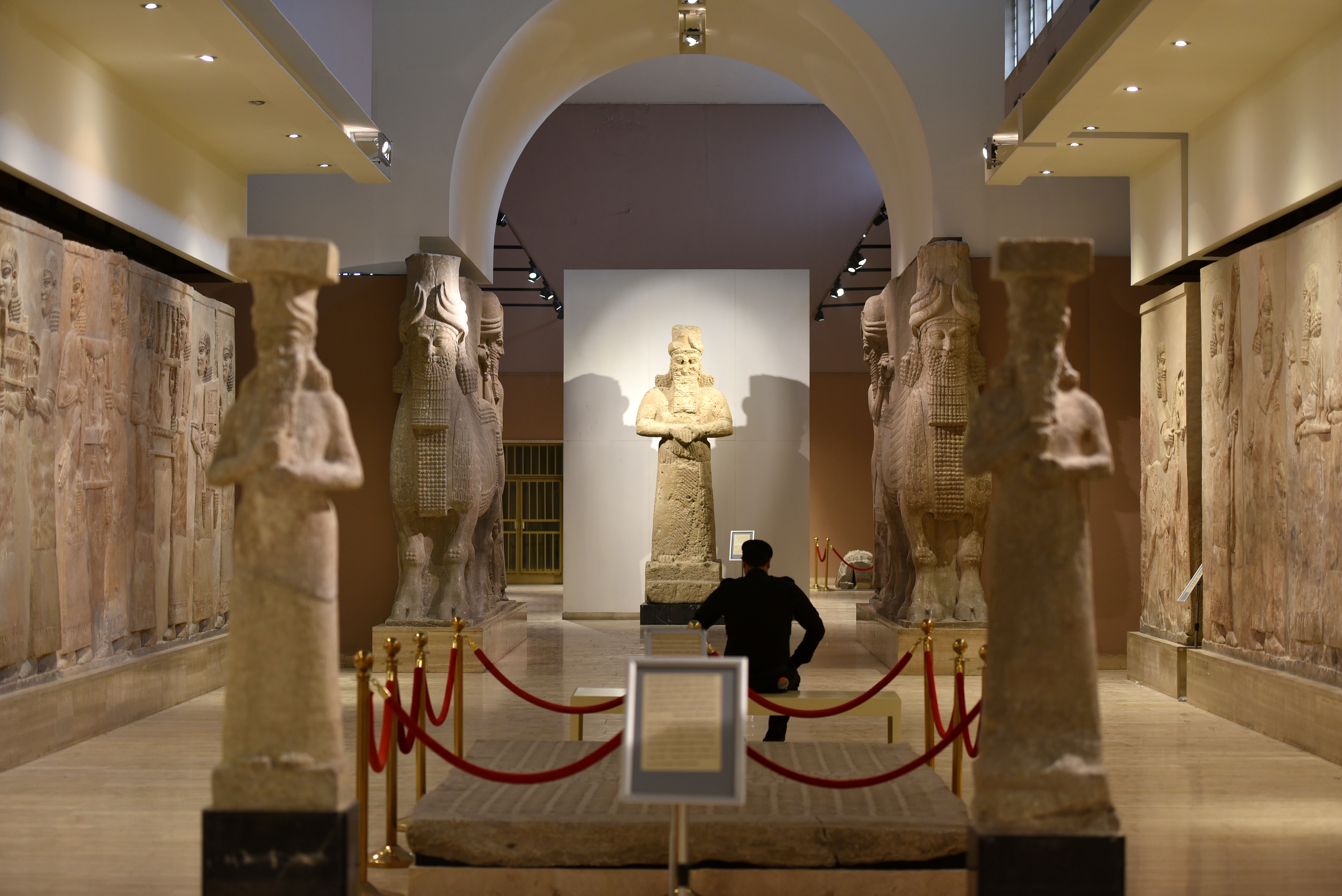
The Assyrian gallery, room X at the Iraq Museum, Baghdad

=== Symbolism and purpose ===
Among these relief images occurred a certain amount of standardization around 870 BC. Carved into each of the stone slabs, including the ones lacking relief, was what is referred to as the Standard Inscription. This text gave the various names and titles of the king, spoke of his relationship with the gods and summarized his military conquests. The text also goes on to describe the founding of Kalhu and speaks of the palace itself. The slabs, which contain relief, consist of depictions of Assurnasirpal's royal ideology. This ideology can be categorized into four main ideas, the military success of the king, his service to the gods, which provided divine protection and Assyrian prosperity.

There is a particular interest in the anatomy of both humans and animals within the depictions. Royal hunting scenes are some of the most well known of the Nimrud reliefs particularly those showing Assurnasirpal II hunting lions. There is also a distinct interest in the relationship between man and animal in many of the scenes. In several depictions the king is shown with supernatural creatures of animal and human combination. All of the apotropaic portrayals, which would have decorated the doorways of the palace, were of these human and animal hybrids. Within the context of these apotropaic figures were three main types, a winged figure wearing the horned crown which symbolized divinity, a winged figure wearing a headband of rosettes and a winged human figure with the head of a bird.

==== Recurring subject matter ====
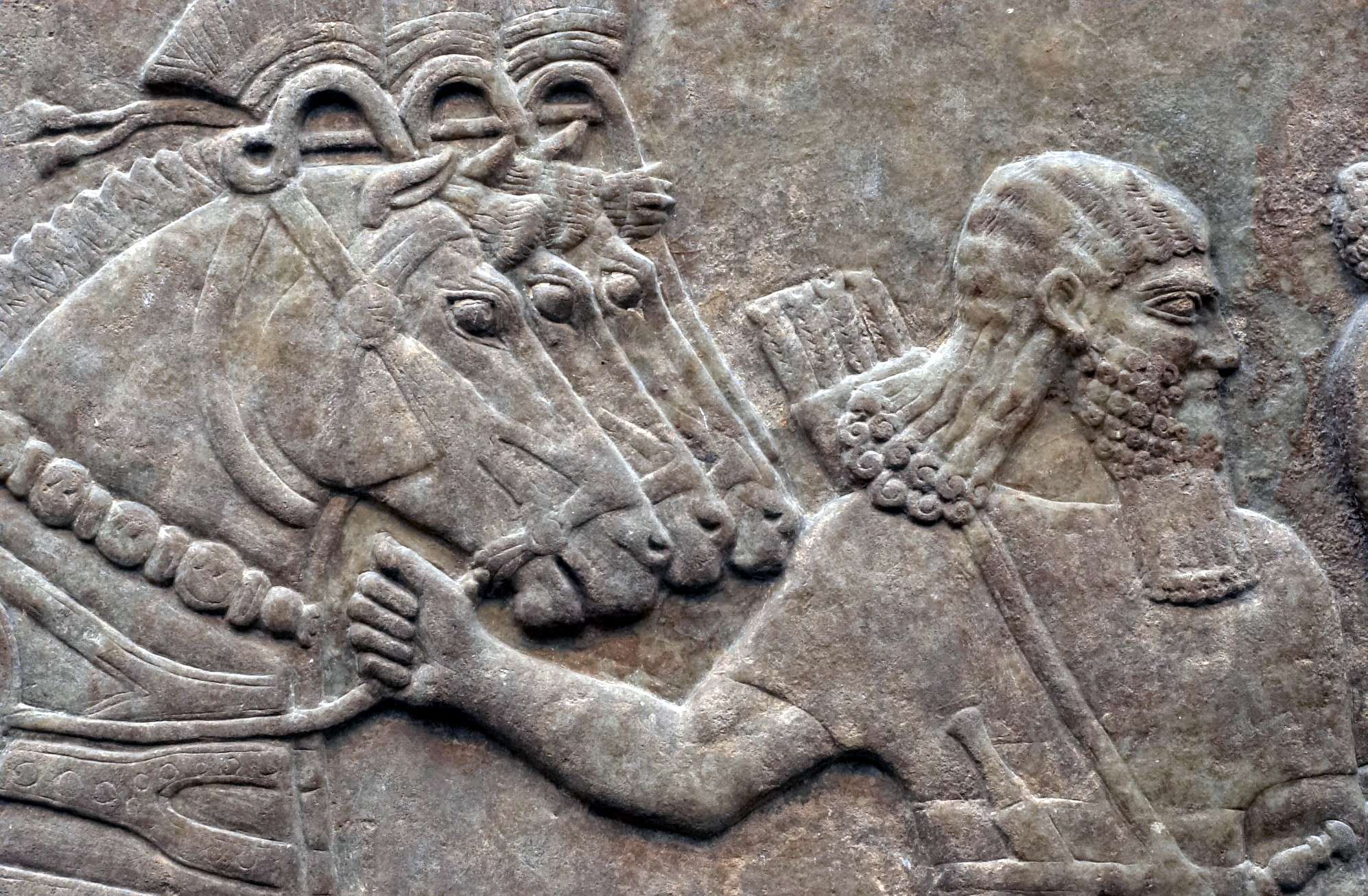
Nimrud relief

Other popular themes in the Nimrud reliefs included military campaigns and victories garnered by the Assyrians. More specifically these were displays of the relationships between Assyrians and non-Assyrians. The Assyrians were always shown in moments of glory while the non-Assyrians are in sprawled or contorted positions and most often naked. These illustrations represented violent death as punishment for violating Assyrian values, as well as merciless punishment for transgressions. Not only would this have served as a clear message for visiting dignitaries from other cultures but also the same message was innately obvious as a warning to the Assyrian elites as to what could happen if they decided to defy the king.

Non-elites were likely not viewing these reliefs, as they would not have often, if ever, been permitted into the palace. The elites would have typically only been present at the palace for rituals and other business with the king. Assyrian women tend to be absent from all of these relief sculptures. This is most likely due to the context of the reliefs, which were male dominated activities. The only exception to women being absent from these scenes is non-Assyrian women who were captured as slaves during war. These were typically the elite women of other cultures, rather than the lower class. In contrast to the way in which male captives were portrayed, women were neither bound nor naked in their depictions. Women captives were most often shown in floor length outfits, with possibly one part of their body exposed in detail.

== Site post-excavations ==
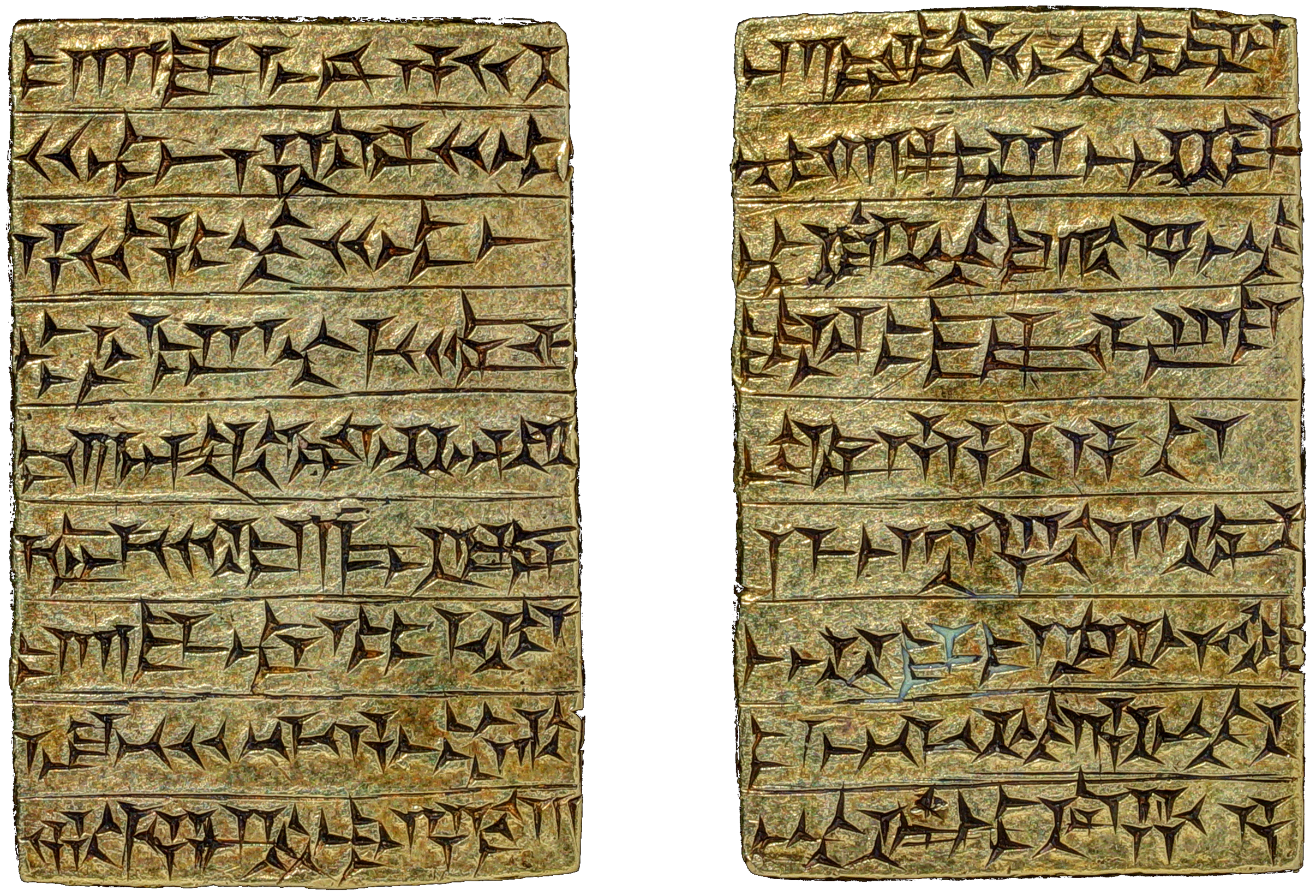
Gold foundation tablet of Ashurnaṣirpal II found in his palace in the city Apqu (modern Tell Abu Marya)

Not all of the relief sculptures have been removed from the palace at Nimrud. Many of them are able to be viewed in their original context, although this is greatly limited. Many of the museums, which currently display the Nimrud reliefs, attempt to recreate the palace atmosphere by exhibiting them in a similar fashion to their original loci.

== Destruction by the ISIL ==
In November 2014, it was reported that ISIL, Islamic State of Iraq and the Levant, militants had looted many of Iraq's archaeological sites, including the palace of Ashurnasirpal II, and were selling artifacts on the black market. According to Aymen Jawad, executive director of Iraq Heritage (based in London), "Tablets, manuscripts and cuneiforms are the most common artifacts being traded, and, unfortunately, this is being seen in Europe and America,” he said. “Hundreds of millions of dollars’ worth of irreplaceable pieces are being sold to fund terrorists."

On 5 March 2015 ISIL reportedly started the demolition of Nimrud. The local palace was bulldozed. Lamassu statues at the gates of the palace of Ashurnasirpal II were smashed.

== Current location of Nimrud reliefs ==
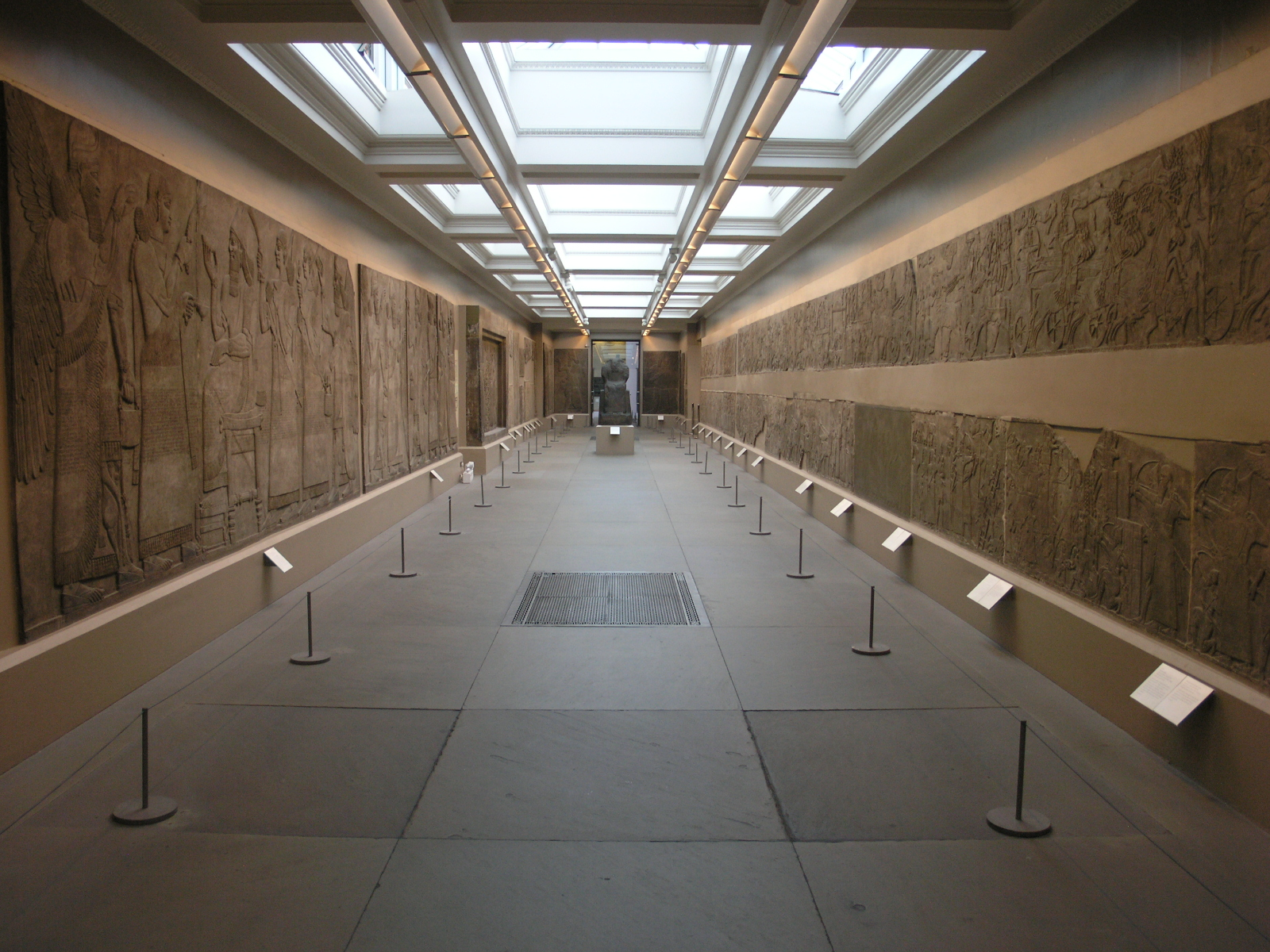
Wall reliefs from the north west palace, at the British Museum

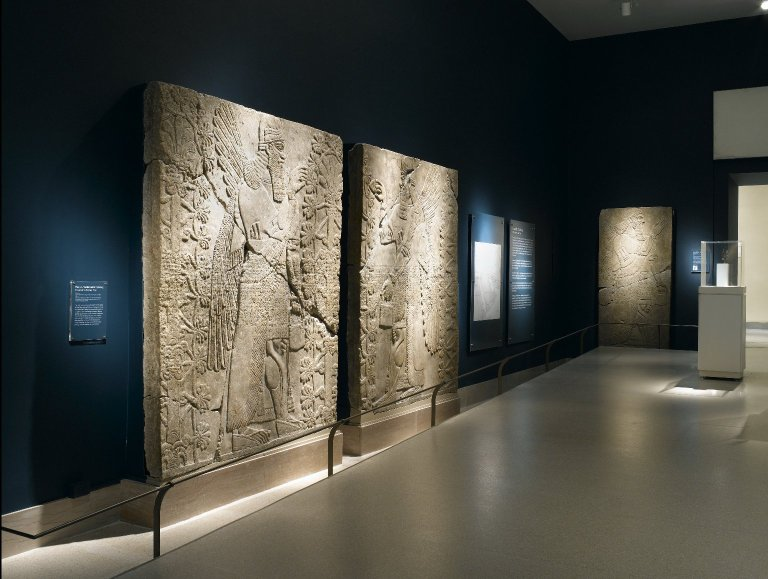
Reliefs from the palace, Brooklyn Museum

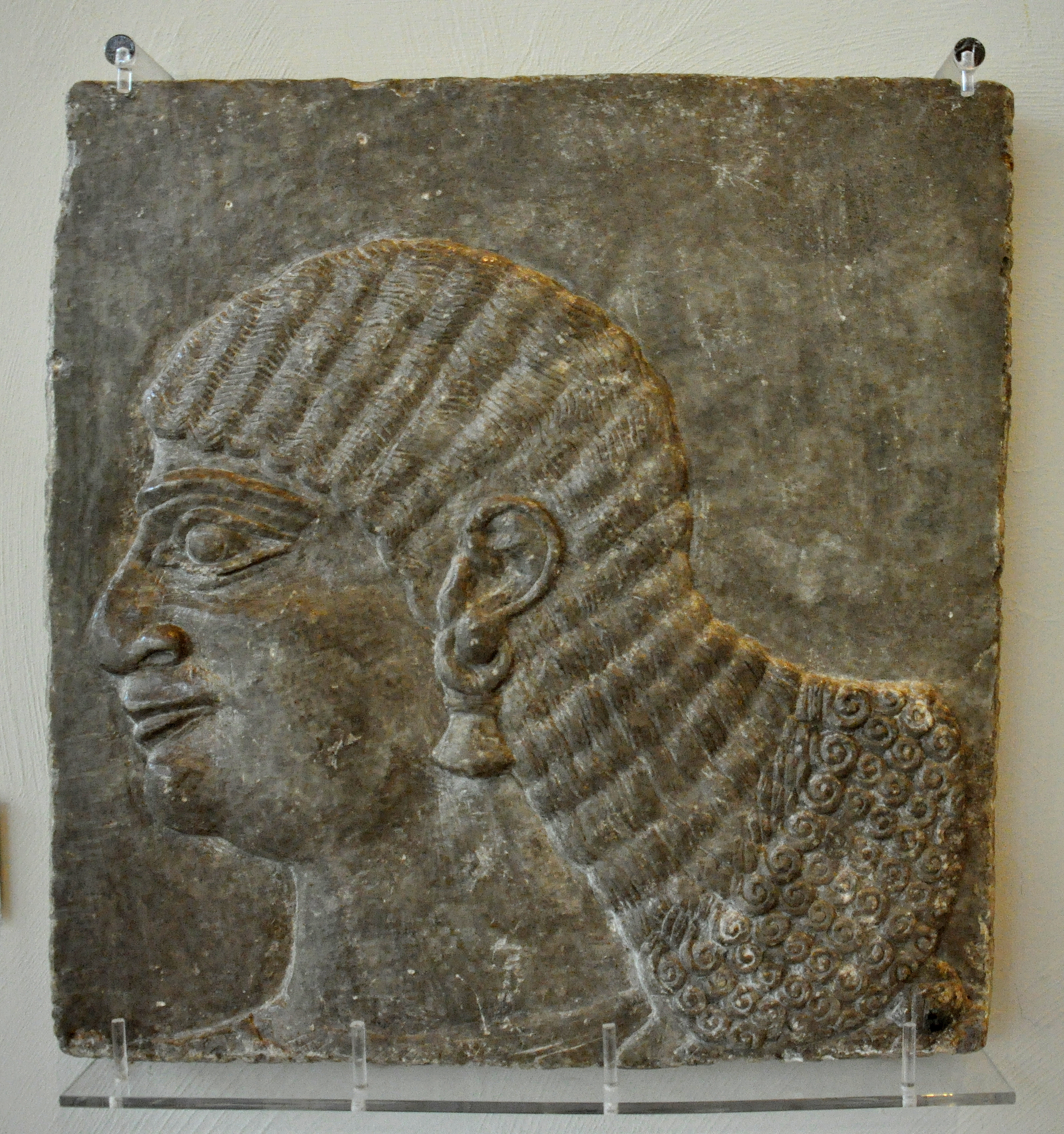
Head of a royal attendant. From the North-West Palace at Nimrud, Iraq. Reign of Ashurnasirpall II, 883–859 BC. The Burrell Collection, Glasgow, UK

United States

- Cleveland Museum of Art, Ohio
- Minneapolis Institute of Art, Minnesota - Winged Genius
- Princeton University Art Museum, New Jersey - Winged Genius
- Yale University Art Gallery, Connecticut - items of the collection
- University of Chicago Oriental Institute, Chicago - relief
- Mead Art Museum, Amherst, Massachusetts
- Williams College Museum of Art, Williamstown, Massachusetts
- Museum of Fine Arts, Boston, Massachusetts
- Brooklyn Museum, New York
- Metropolitan Museum of Art, New York - items of the collection
- Hood Museum of Art, Hanover, New Hampshire
- Walters Art Museum, Baltimore, Maryland
- Museum of Fine Arts, Houston, Texas
- Kimbell Art Museum, Fort Worth, Texas
- Saint Louis Art Museum, Missouri
- Nelson Atkins Museum of Art, Kansas City, Missouri
- Fleming Museum of Art, Burlington, Vermont
- Bowdoin College Museum of Art, Brunswick, Maine
- Fine Arts Museums of San Francisco, Palace of the Legion of Honor
- Los Angeles County Museum of Art

United Kingdom

- Ashmolean Museum, Oxford
- British Museum, London
- Bristol Museum & Art Gallery, Bristol
- Fitzwilliam Museum, Cambridge
- National Museum of Scotland, Edinburgh
- The Burrell Collection, Glasgow

Europe

- Pergamon Museum, Berlin, Germany
- Staatliche Sammlung für Ägyptische Kunst, Munich, Germany
- Skulpturensammlung, Dresden, Germany
- Calouste Gulbenkian Museum, Lisbon, Portugal
- Royal Museums of Art and History, Brussels, Belgium

Middle East

- Basra Museum, Iraq
- Iraq Museum, Baghdad, Iraq
- Mosul Museum, Iraq
- Sulaymaniyah Museum, Iraq
- Erbil Civilization Museum, Iraq
- Basra Museum, Iraq
- Museum of the Ancient Orient, Istanbul Archaeology Museums, Turkey

== See also ==
- Kurkh Monoliths
- Lamassu

| Preceded by Tukulti-Ninurta II | King of Assyria; 884–859 BC | Succeeded by Shalmaneser III |
