= Destruction of Mosul Museum artifacts =

By the Islamic State in 2015

The destruction of Mosul Museum artifacts became publicly known on 26 February 2015, when the group known as the Islamic State released a video showing their destruction.

== Mosul Museum ==
The Mosul Museum, opened in 1952, is the second- largest museum in Iraq, after the National Museum of Iraq. The museum is split into four areas of focus: the Assyrian hall, the Hatrene hall, the Islamic hall, and the Prehistoric hall.

=== Importance of the region ===
Iraq's present- day borders overlap with the historic extent of Mesopotamia. Mesopotamia is considered to be one of the first areas in which urbanization evolved, beginning around the 4th millennium B.C. The "city" became the center of the new social system, resulting in the need for centralized power. Artistically, the land of Iraq holds evidence of the switch from stylized and schematic figures to more realistic representations of the human form. Writing evolved during this time period as well, allowing people to describe divine figures and conceptualize religion. Archaeological efforts uncovered evidence of Mesopotamia as a world contemporary with the Bible, with many cuneiform tablets describing versions of stories similar to those in biblical texts.

Modern understanding of Iraq and its history comes from the archaeological efforts that have taken place on its land. Because of a lack of visible architectural remains in the area, Mesopotamia, and Iraq in particular, is where the "treasure hunting" of old transformed into the beginnings of modern archaeological research. Archaeologists have been researching in Iraq for over a century and a half, providing considerable insight into the region's impact on those who live there and on the rest of the world.

== Destruction (2015) ==
=== Contents of ISIL video ===
A video released on 26 February 2015 shows members of ISIL entering the Mosul Museum with the purpose of destroying artifacts they deemed "idolatrous". Members of the group can be seen pushing over many statues, while using jackhammers and sledgehammers to damage the faces of others. A spokesperson appears at the beginning of the video, explaining the rationale behind the group's actions: that these objects (statues, figurines, etc.) were once worshiped instead of Allah.

A translation from the video is as follows: "These ruins that are behind me, they are idols and statues that people in the past used to worship instead of Allah. The so-called Assyrians and Akkadians and others looked to gods for war, agriculture and rain to whom they offered sacrifices…The Prophet Mohammed took down idols with his bare hands when he went into Mecca. We were ordered by our prophet to take down idols and destroy them, and the companions of the prophet did this after this time, when they conquered countries."

=== Damage ===
Not all of the museum's collection was damaged by ISIL; the Assyrian and Hatrene areas of the museum were the most affected. The Islamic hall, which still held many antiquities, was not shown in the video. The Prehistoric hall was also not shown, though most of its artifacts had been removed prior to the destruction.

==== Assyrian ====
- Nergal Gate: The Nergal Gate is located on the north side of Nineveh, an ancient Mesopotamian city located in present-day Mosul. The gate was built sometime between 704 and 690 BC, which was a time of expansion for Nineveh under the ruler Sennacherib. The gate is related to the ancient Mesopotamian god Nergal, who was associated with the summer solstice, war, destruction, and the netherworld.
- Lamassu: At the Nergal Gate's entrance, and just within the entrance, stand the lamassu. These mythological figures first began appearing in art and architecture during the first half of the second millennium B.C., and are described as large winged human-headed bulls. Aside from being decoration, the lamassu are protective figures, more specifically described as "a benevolent spirit attached to an individual, group, a place or an entrance." The lamassu erected at the entrance of the Nergal Gate at Nineveh are surrounded by relief sculpture that depicts the stages of transport of the human-headed bulls from quarries in Balatai.

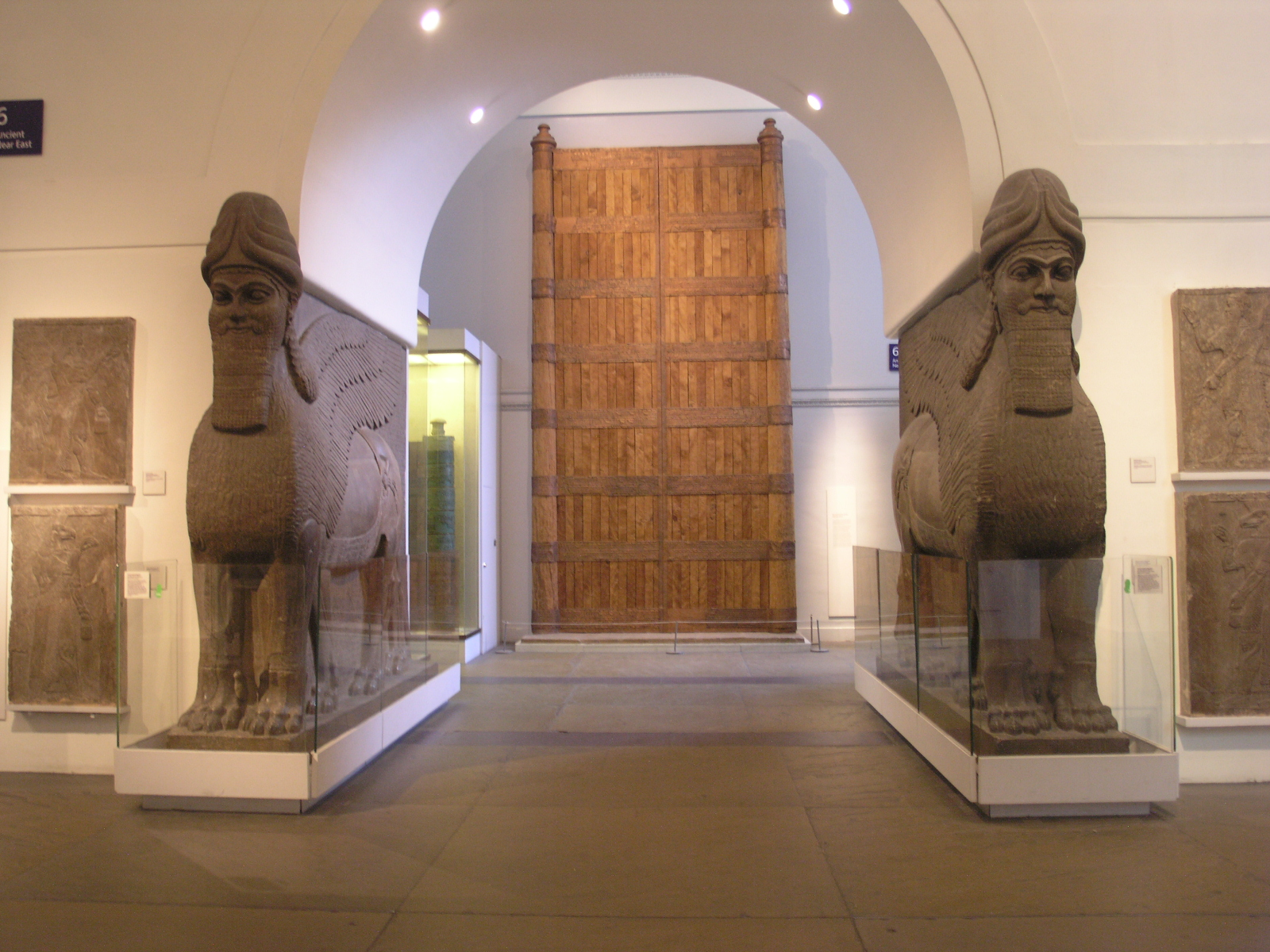
Lamassu and Balawat Gate in the British Museum

Before the release of the ISIL video on 26 February 2015, the lamassu were in various states of preservation. Of the two figures at the entrance of the gate, one still had its upper portion preserved. The video shows an ISIL member jackhammering the face of the lamassu at the right side of the gate. The left one was probably untouched, as it has been missing its upper portion since the late 19th century. The ones located inside the gates were less well-preserved than their counterparts at the entrance; however, both were seen being damaged by jackhammers and sledgehammers. The Assyrian section within the Mosul Museum also holds other lamassu of an earlier style, which may also have been damaged.

==== Balawat Gates ====
The Mosul Museum holds in its collection numerous bronze bands of the Balawat Gates, built during the reign of Ashurnasirpal II (883–859 BC). The bands are decorated with scenes of Assyrian war, hunt, and tribute. The Balawat Gates are of archaeological and historical significance because they are considered a "'major' find from a 'minor'" site. Tell-Balawat, the site from which the Balawat Gates originate, was considered a small site in comparison to the neighboring Assyrian sites of Nineveh and Nimrud. Through further research, Tell-Balawat (also known as the city of Igmur-Enlil), was found to be within a "hollow-way" between Nineveh and Nimrud, suggesting that its purpose included defending these two cities.

The displayed bands are shown in ISIL's video, but it is unknown whether they were destroyed at that time. Because the Mosul Museum had been looted in 2003, some of the bands were already missing. Since the bands are portable, it is assumed that some were sold on the black market. The British Museum holds a second pair of the Balawat Gates, built during the reign of Shalmaneser III. These are well documented and can be used to aid in the identification of Ashurnasirpal's bands if they resurface.

==== Hatrene statues ====
Hatra was an ancient city located between the Roman Empire and the Parthian Empire, to the south of present-day Mosul. Its historical and archaeological record indicates that it was a wealthy trading city, influenced heavily by its neighboring peoples and empires. Hatra's artworks are of interest to scholars because they have been analyzed as hybrids of artistic styles from the West and East of the city. For example, a Hatrene statue of a seated goddess is described as having drapery consistent with Buddhist style, while also having the large, protruding eyes typical of Mesopotamian works.

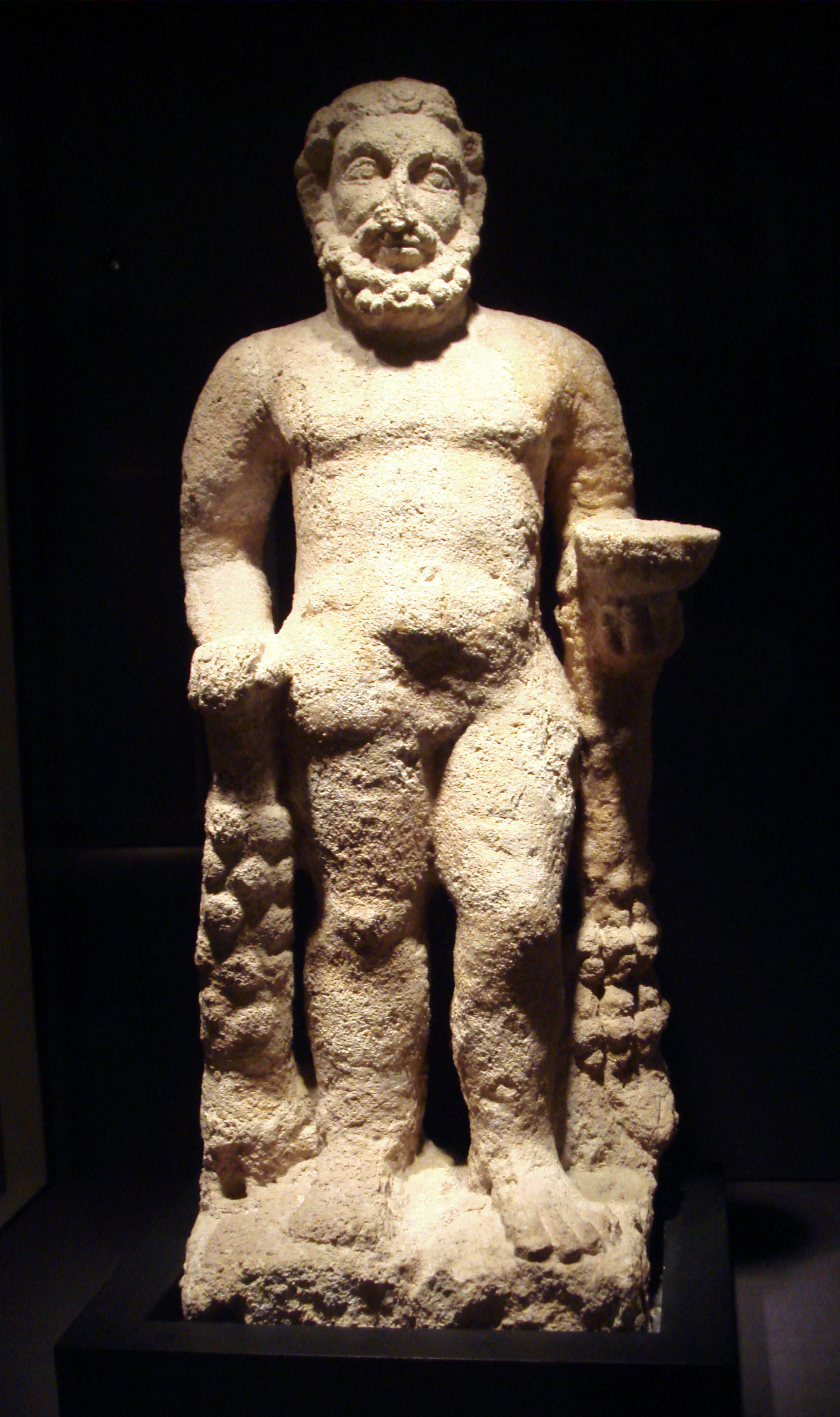
Hatrene statue of Hercules

The Mosul Museum was home to a variety of Hatra's sculptures, most of which were images of Hatrene kings or noblemen. The ISIL video shows many of these sculptures being hit with sledgehammers and toppled to the ground. Of the 27 known Hatrene sculptures of kings, 4 were seen being damaged in the ISIL video, representing a 15% loss of the known surviving examples.

==== Questioned authenticity of damaged artifacts ====
According to Iraqi archaeologists, some of the collection belonging to the Mosul Museum was moved to the National Museum of Iraq in Baghdad six months prior to the release of the ISIL video, sparing many artifacts from damage. Additionally, sources have suggested that a portion of the artifacts shown being damaged in the video were in fact reproductions or reconstructions. However, Iraqi archaeologists state this may not be entirely the case. Some artworks known to have been genuine were not shown in the video, leading archaeologists to believe that the portable objects were looted, while larger, non-portable objects were the only ones to be damaged.

=== Documentation ===
The 2003 looting of the National Museum of Iraq demonstrated to the cultural heritage community the importance of documentation within a museum or archaeological setting. The National Museum of Iraq lacked a complete inventory, including photographs of all objects. The problem was exacerbated by the influx of salvaged archaeological materials into the museum from the late 1990s until the 2003 invasion of Iraq, which made it very difficult for the staff to keep up with its documentation process.

The Mosul Museum may have been in a similar situation, though information on its documentation processes has not been made public. If photographs of its artifacts exist, they would be useful in identifying and recovering the looted artifacts.

=== Responses ===
==== Agencies involved ====
- UNESCO

==== Cultural Heritage Communities ====
- Artist Uses 3D Tech to Recreate Past Destroyed by ISIS
- Museums Responding to Mosul and Nimrud
- "Iraq's National Museum Reopens Earlier in Response to Outrage over Mosul". Deutsche Welle. 28 February 2015.
- Project Mosul: Archaeologists Fight Back ISIS Heritage Destruction with 3D Museum Online

== See also ==
- Mosul Museum
- Destruction of cultural heritage by the Islamic State
- Mesopotamia
- Archaeological looting in Iraq
- List of destroyed heritage
- UNESCO
- Rekrei
- Destruction of the Buddhas of Bamiyan
