= Rekrei =

Digital preservation project

Rekrei, or Project Mosul, is a digital preservation project that uses the collaboration of different sources (crowdsource), primarily photos and images, to help to reconstruct and preserve cultural heritage. Rekrei collects images from lost sites, artifacts, or artwork, hoping to construct 3D models quite similar, if not identical, to original objects. Such cultural heritage sites and objects include those in threat of being damaged or destroyed, whether by natural forces or human influences.

== Background ==
During the destruction of Mosul Museum artifacts by ISIL (Islamic State of Iraq and the Levant) in 2015, ISIL members entered the Mosul Museum and recorded themselves on camera, as they proceeded to destroy exhibits from early Mesopotamian civilizations, including those from the Akkadian Empire and ancient Assyria. The jihadist group viewing these statues, reliefs, and other artifacts as idolatry, ISIL justified the destruction of museum collections, as well as having the same motivation, when destroying sites of historical and cultural significance across the area. The destruction of ancient Mesopotamian cities, including Nimrud and Hatra, occurred shortly after the destruction of Mesopotamian cultural artifacts in Mosul.

=== International response ===
Following ISIL's destruction of sites and artifacts in and around Mosul, UNESCO describes the relevance and the influence of these ancient cities as important to the "greatness of civilization, further referring to their demolition as a "war crime". Some sites were still mostly unexplored and not cataloged before their destruction, thus eliminating any opportunity for future excavation.

== Formation of Project Mosul ==
Despite lacking any record of unexplored sites, Chance Coughenour and Matthew Vincent, both part of the Initial Training Network for Digital Cultural Heritage (ITN-DCH), realized that applying the use of photogrammetry to recreate destroyed works of art, statues, and sites may help to create a digital record or archive to curate these destroyed works, while simultaneously allowing for future study, appreciation, and analysis. Though known today as Rekrei, the project began in 2015 as Project Mosul, named after the museum. Their efforts to obtain thousands of photos through public cooperation, including stills taken from ISIL videos, continues to allow for the reconstruction and the reproduction of works of art destroyed by ISIL, sometimes to surprising accuracy.

== Success ==
As of May 2015, the efforts of Project Mosul proved quite successful, having produced fifteen 3D reconstructions, solely from images collected, in a period of three months. At that time, Coughenour and Vincent received 700 images, among which 543 were depicting artifacts and artworks from Mosul. When producing 3D objects from 2D images, greater accuracy for the reproductions arises from having more images, thus enhancing quality. Project Mosul began by promoting cooperation across the internet, as people, who possessed previous images from the Mosul Museum or other sites, were able to contribute to the bank of photos collected. This also allowed for continuous collaboration of efforts and dissemination of results and reconstructions from the team; however, efforts to obtain photos after 2003 remained difficult, this being due to the museum's closing during US military intervention in Iraq.

=== Rekrei today ===
To expand their efforts to a more international scope, Project Mosul changed to Rekrei, a word meaning 'recreate' in the Esperanto language. While beginning with hopes of reconstructing, curating, and protecting cultural heritage from destruction, Coughenour and Vincent have broadened their pursuits to include protecting cultural heritage objects and sites from the threat of natural disaster, as well. Rekrei helps as an organization to advocate for the preservation of cultural heritage that may be destroyed in the future, hoping to establish archives of digital data and reconstructions to prevent losses, such as those in Mosul. In regards to these aspirations, founder Matthew Vincent says, "3D printing is really proving to be one of the most valuable assets for heritage that we have today. It's a way to bring them back to life and have a tactile experience with them, even if we can't guarantee that they're exactly as the original would have been... Whether it is because of conflict or natural disaster, our heritage is such a delicate and valuable resource, the only way that we can really preserve it is to take the steps to make those digital surrogates, so that we can protect the physical reality of that heritage as well." Rekrei continues to create 3D reconstructions from images. As of 2016, Rekrei provides a virtual museum tour of Mosul Museum, displaying the museum as it stood before destruction by ISIL.

== See also ==
- Mosul Museum
- Destruction of cultural heritage by ISIL
