= Balawat =

Assyrian archaeological site in Iraq

- ܒܝܬ ܠܒܬ (Classical Syriac)
- Location within Iraq
- 36°13′46″N 43°24′12″E on
- Location: Nineveh Governorate, Iraq
- Region: Northern Mesopotamia

Site notes
- Excavation dates: 1878, 1956, 1989
- Archaeologists: Hormuzd Rassam, M. Mallowan, D.J. Tucker

Balawat (Classical Syriac: ܒܝܬ ܠܒܬ, beṯ labat) is an archaeological site of the ancient Assyrian city of Imgur-Enlil, and modern village in Nineveh Province (Iraq). It lies 25 kilometres (16 mi) southeast from the city of Mosul and 4 kilometres (2.5 mi) to the south of the modern Assyrian town of Bakhdida.

== Ancient name ==
Balawat is the site of the ancient Assyrian city of Imgur-Enlil. The meaning of Imgur-Enlil is "Enlil agreed". Note that there was also a wall in ancient Babylon named Imgur-Enlil.

== History of archaeological research ==
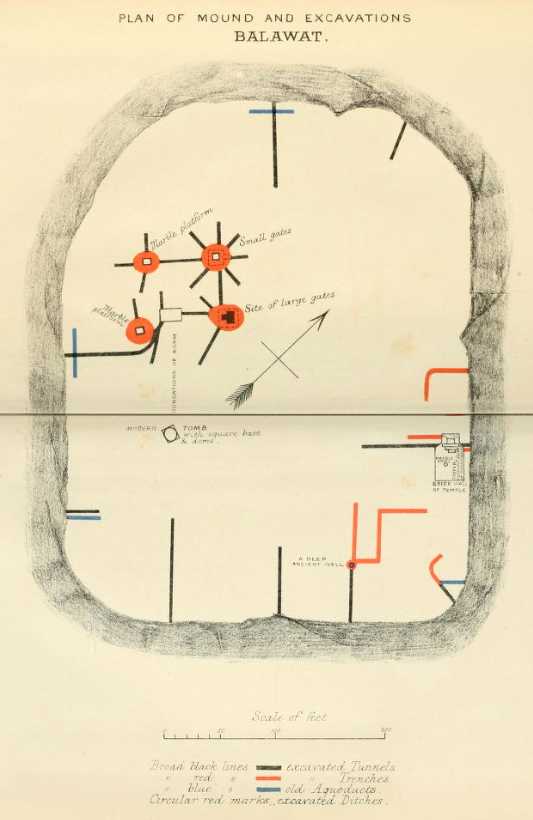
Balawat Excavation Plan 1882

The site was excavated in 1878 by archaeologist Hormuzd Rassam. The site was again excavated by Max Mallowan for the British School of Archaeology in Iraq in 1956. A surface survey was conducted by D. J. Tucker in 1989 for the British Museum. The town walls enclosed an area of around 64 hectares.

== Occupation history ==
The city of Imgur-Enlil was founded by the Neo-Assyrian king Ashurnasirpal II (884-859 BC). It lay 10 kilometres (6.2 mi) up the Derrah river from the Tigris, where the city of Kalhu (Biblical Nimrud/Calah) was situated. Imgur-Enlil lay between the major Neo-Assyrian cities of Nineveh and Arrapḫa (modern Kirkuk) in the southeast along the royal Neo-Assyrian road. Ashurnasirpal II had already transferred the capital from Assur to Kalhu, and the foundation of Imgur-Enlil may have been a further step to knit up the Neo-Assyrian empire. Construction at the site continued under Ashurnasirpal II's son Shalmaneser III. The city existed for about two and a half centuries but was, like most Neo-Assyrian cities, sacked and destroyed by the Medes, Babylonians and Scythians during the fall of the Neo-Assyrian empire 614-605 BC.

=== Post U.S.-Iraq War construction ===
In November 2004, the village had roads constructed by the United States Army, which connected the modern Assyrian village to the ancient Assyrian city of Kalhu and the village of Bakhdida (Al Hamdaniyah.) The project was dubbed "Ninewa Village Roads Project" and was funded by the U.S. government. The contract to build the roads was given to the Ashour General Construction Contracting Company and cost $1,120,000.

== Material culture ==
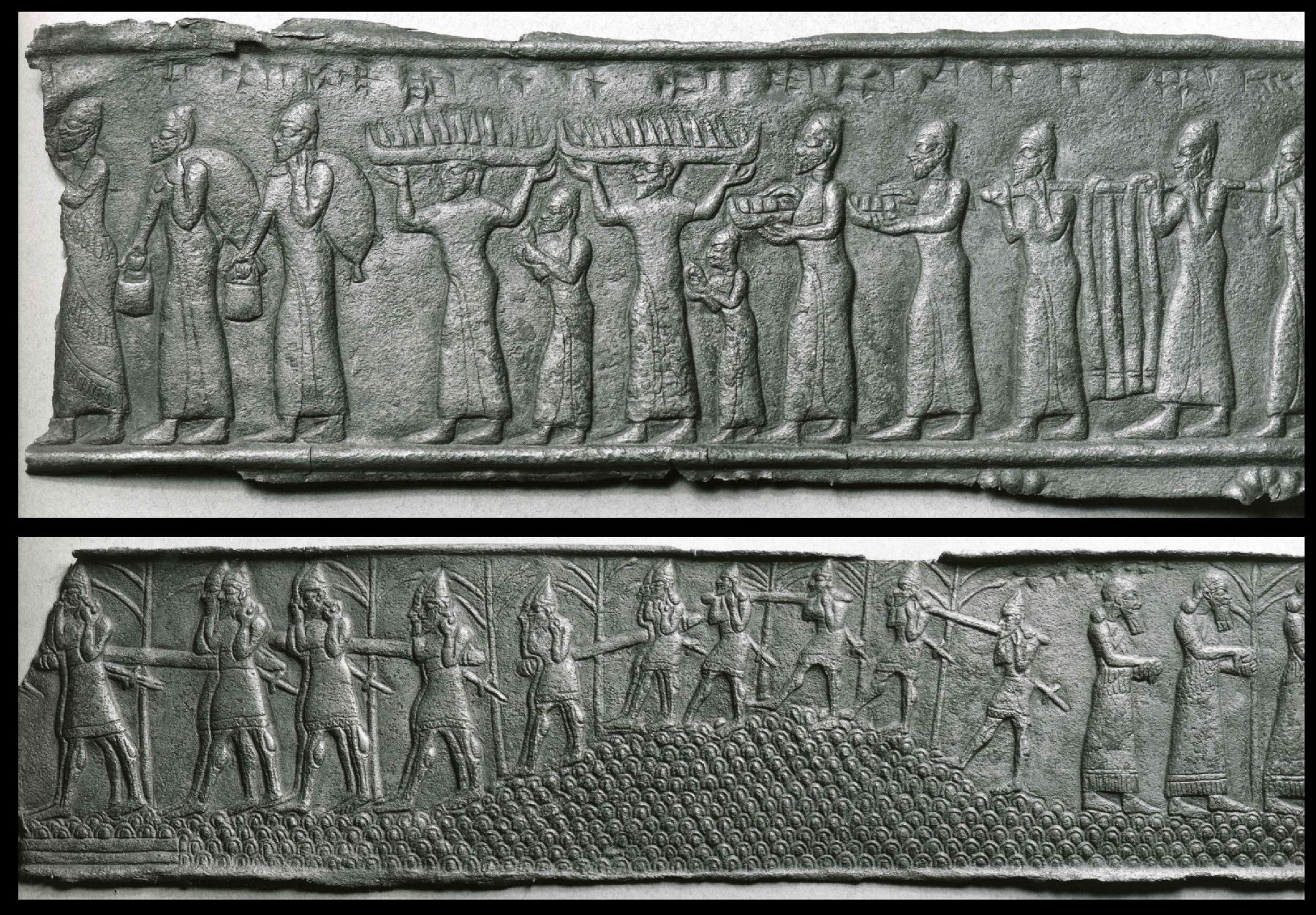
The Walters Art Museum fragments of the Balawat Gates. (Top) Syrian porters in long robes and conical hats carry tribute to the Assyrian camp. (Bottom) Assyrian soldiers carry logs as they march through a hilly, forested landscape.

Aside from temples and palace buildings, the most important artifacts discovered there were the so-called Balawat Gates. The gates measured about 20 feet in height and belonged to the temple of Mamu, the god of dreams. These were made up of bronze bands attached through nails to two wooden gates of the palace. The bronze bands depict a sacrifice and war scenes from the campaigns of the Neo-Assyrian king Shalmaneser III (859-824 BC), and were the first depictions of landscape elements (such as trees and mountains) in Assyrian art.

== See also ==
- List of cities of the ancient Near East
