= Mosul Museum =

National history museum in Iraq

- متحف الموصل
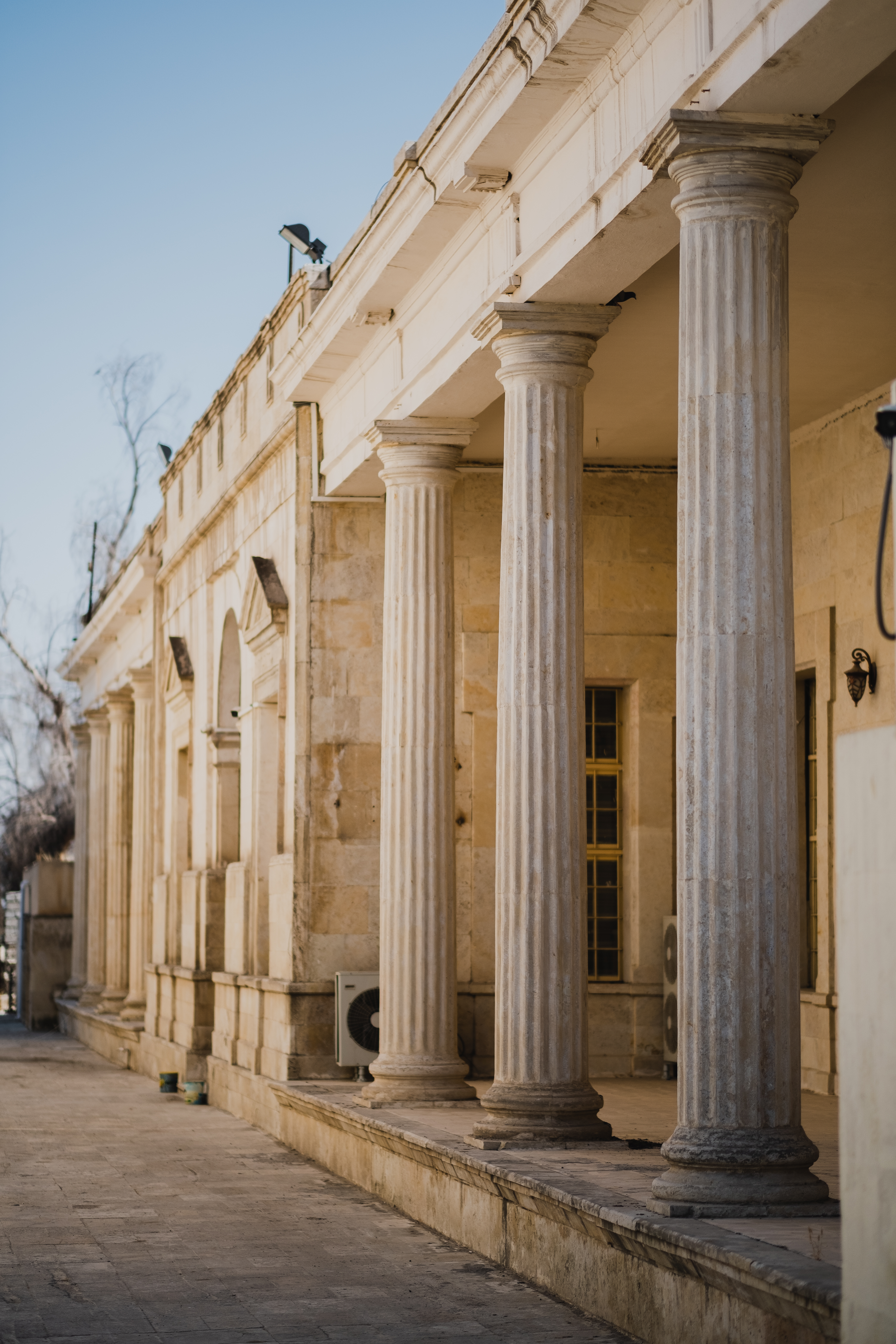
- Views around the Mosul Museum in the old city of Mosul in 2019 during the summer, following war with the Islamic State

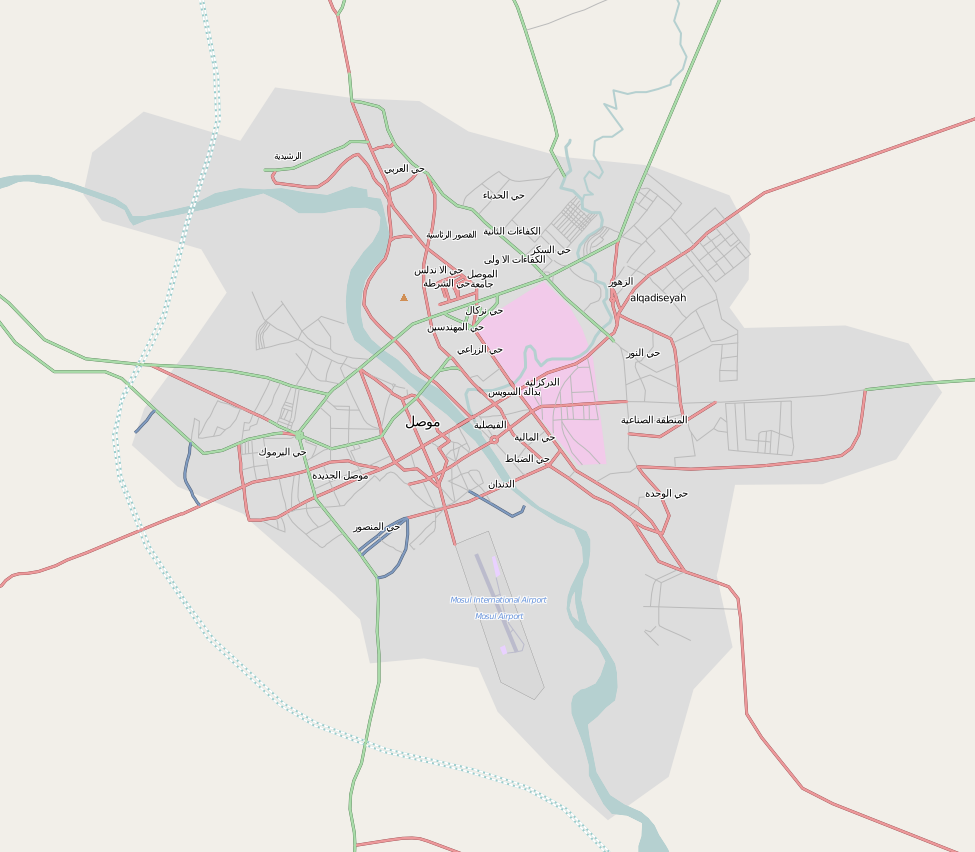
- Location within Mosul
- Former name: Mosul Museum of History
- Established: 1952
- Location: Mosul, Iraq
- Coordinates: 36.337923°N 43.139372°E
- Type: National History Museum
- Collections: 2,200 objects
- Director: Zaid Ghazi Saadallah
- Owners: Ministry of Tourism and Antiquities

The Mosul Museum (Arabic: متحف الموصل) is the second largest museum in Iraq after the National Museum of Iraq in Baghdad. It was heavily looted during the 2003 Iraq War. Founded in 1952, the museum consisted of a small hall until a new building was opened in 1972, containing ancient Assyrian artifacts. The museums net worth and content value are around 50 to 80 to 250 million according to museum specialists during 2013 at least. Hikmat Al-Aswad was the director from 2004 to 2011. The current director is Zaid Ghazi Saadallah.

== Collection ==
The museum is mainly focused on finds dating back to the Assyrian and Hellenistic periods, preceding the birth of Christianity.

== ISIL seizure and destruction spree ==
In 2014 the Islamic State occupied the museum as it was about to reopen after years of rebuilding. ISIL said that its statues were against Islam and threatened to destroy the museum's contents.

On 26 February 2015, a day after burning books from Mosul libraries, the group released a video showing the destruction of artifacts in the museum and at the archaeological site at Nimrud, claiming the sites promoted "Idolatry". ISIL stated that they also intended to destroy the historic walls of Nineveh.

There has been quite some confusion whether artefacts destroyed by ISIL militants were originals or just copies. Mossul's exiled governor Atheel al-Nujaifi said that many of the most important works, except for the larger objects, were transferred to the Baghdad Museum after the 2003 Iraq War, the most valuable ones having been sent to Baghdad already after the 1991 Gulf War. Later in March, the director of Iraq's antiquities administration, Fawzye al-Mahdi, however, incorrectly stated that "none of the artifacts destroyed in the video was an original." As al-Nujaifi specified, "there were two items that were real and which the militants destroyed: one is a winged bull and the other was the God of Rozhan."

It was revealed that ISIS has turned the artifact warehouse into a tax office – the "Diwan Zakat" – to collect dues from its Islamist fighters.

In 2017 the city of Mosul was recaptured by the Iraqi troops; the museum was described as damaged, with some artifacts likely plundered and sold off by ISIS troops, and others damaged or destroyed, sometimes intentionally.

=== Destroyed displays ===
- Statue - Representation of Sanatruq.
- Winged Lion of Nimrud.
- Statue - depicting a Priest of Mosul.
- Mask of the city of Hatra.
- Winged bull with a human head.
- Nergal Gate.

The city would be recovered by the Iraqi army after a long battle on July 9, 2017.

=== Reactions ===
In late February, UNESCO director-general Irina Bokova requested an emergency meeting of the U.N. Security Council "on the protection of Iraq's cultural heritage as an integral element for the country's security".

=== Post-liberation recovery ===
In 2018, the International alliance for the protection of heritage in conflict areas (ALIPH), committed nearly US$1.5 million to rehabilitate the museum, in partnership with the Louvre Museum, the Smithsonian Institution, and the Iraqi State Board of Antiquities and Heritage to implement the project. The first measures were to stabilize the building (shoring up collapsing floors, removing live ordnance from the roof) and to safely store the museum's collection.

In cooperation with the Government of Iraq and Municipality of Mosul, the Iraqi civil society organisation Al-Ghad and the Mosul Artists’ Committee hosted the first event in Mosul Museum since the city's occupation in 2014. The art exhibition, ‘Return to Mosul’, opened on 29 January and closed on 3 February 2019, and brought together artistic voices from across Iraq and Mosul and enhanced them with technology including 3D printing and virtual reality experiences. It commissioned and exhibited paintings, photographs and sculpture that told the story of the city's occupation under the extremist organisation ISIS and articulated a vision of the local community's hopes for recovery and reconstruction. The exhibition brought together many different ethno-sectarian groups, previously fractured by the divisive actions and narratives of ISIS, and encouraged them to discuss their vision of a brighter, more tolerant future in Mosul. The exhibition was staged in the newly restored Royal Venue, in the old wing of the museum.

=== Reopening ===
On July 10, 2020, Iraq's newly appointed prime minister, Mustafa Al-Kadhimi, reopened the Mosul Museum during his visit to mark six years since the ISIL occupation.

== See also ==
- List of museums in Iraq
- Archaeological looting in Iraq
- Destruction of cultural heritage by ISIL or ISIS in 2014–2015
- Buddhas of Bamyan
- Rekrei
