= Tree of life =

Motif in art and culture

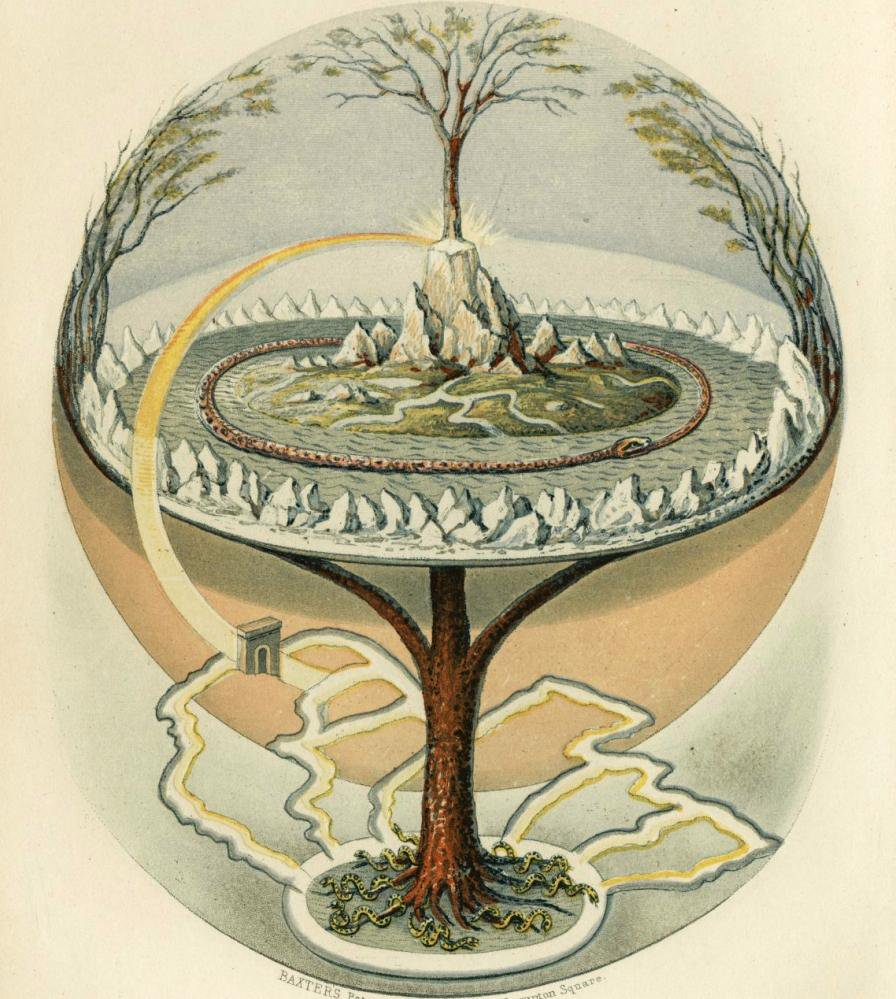
An 1847 depiction of the Norse Yggdrasil as described in the Icelandic Prose Edda by Oluf Olufsen Bagge

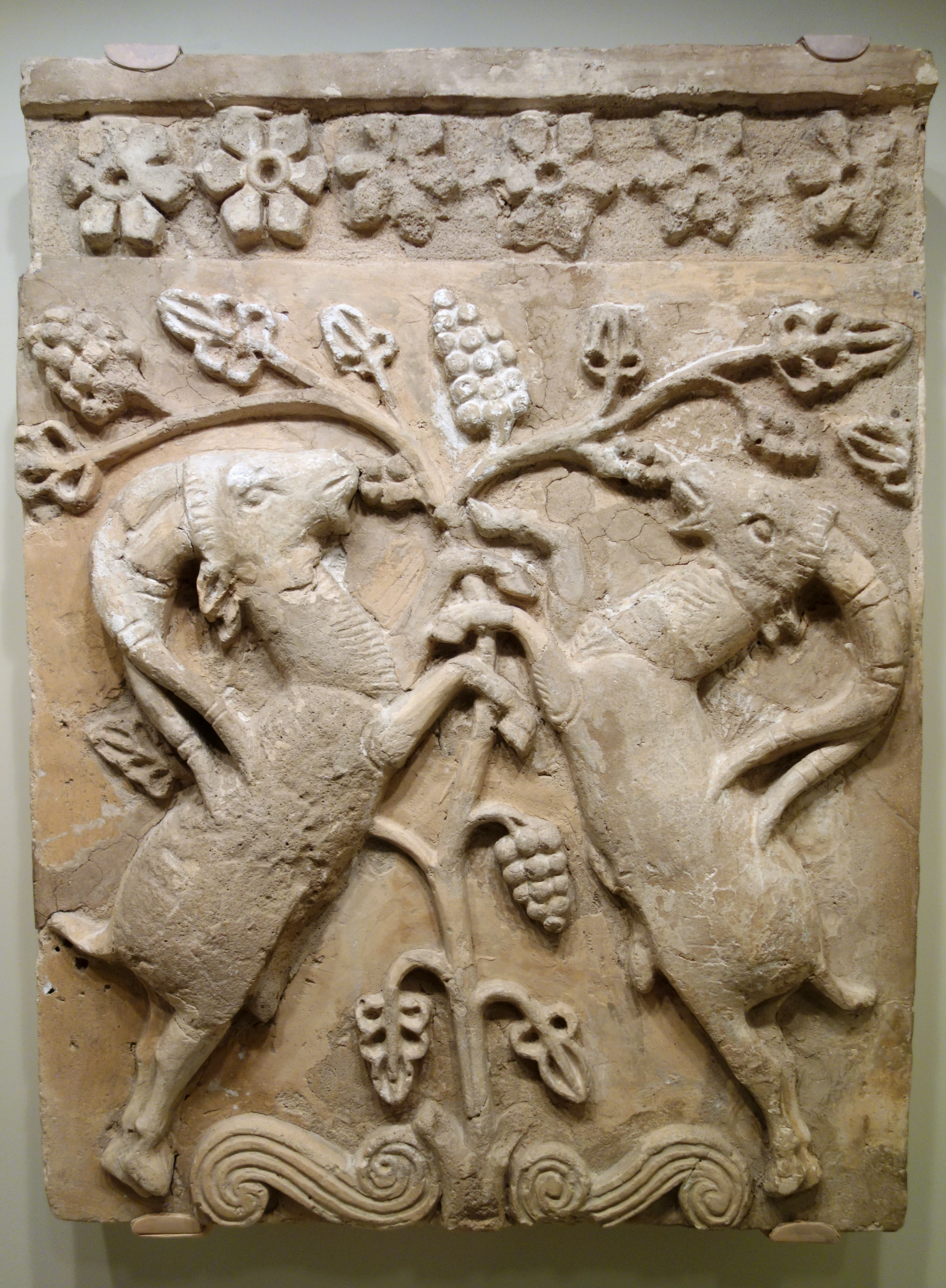
Confronted animals, here ibexes, flank a tree of life, a very common motif in the art of the ancient Near East and Mediterranean

The tree of life is a fundamental archetype in many of the world's mythological, religious, and philosophical traditions. It is closely related to the concept of the sacred tree. The tree of the knowledge of good and evil and the tree of life both appear in Genesis' Garden of Eden as part of the Jewish cosmology of creation, and the tree of knowledge connecting to heaven and the underworld such as Yggdrasil, are forms of the world tree or cosmic tree, and are portrayed in various religions and philosophies as the same tree.

Scholars differ on whether it was Egypt or Mesopotamia who was the originator of the motif, or that it was a "meta-metaphor" which arose in different cultures.

== Religion and mythology ==
Various trees of life are recounted in folklore, culture and fiction, often relating to immortality or fertility. They had their origin in religious symbolism. According to professor Elvyra Usačiovaitė, a "typical" imagery preserved in ancient iconography is that of two symmetrical figures facing each other, with a tree standing in the middle. The two characters may variously represent rulers, gods, and even a deity and a human follower.

=== Ancient Mesopotamia ===
The Assyrian tree of life was represented by a series of nodes and crisscrossing lines. It was apparently an important religious symbol, often attended to in Assyrian palace reliefs by human or eagle-headed winged genies, or the King, and blessed or fertilized with bucket and cone. Assyriologists have not reached consensus as to the meaning of this symbol. The name "Tree of Life" has been attributed to it by modern scholarship; it is not used in the Assyrian sources. In fact, no textual evidence pertaining to the symbol is known to exist.

The Epic of Gilgamesh is a similar quest for immortality. In Babylonian religion, Etana, the King of Kish, searched for a 'plant of birth' to provide him with a son. This has a solid provenance of antiquity, being found in cylinder seals from the Akkadian Empire (2390–2249 BCE).

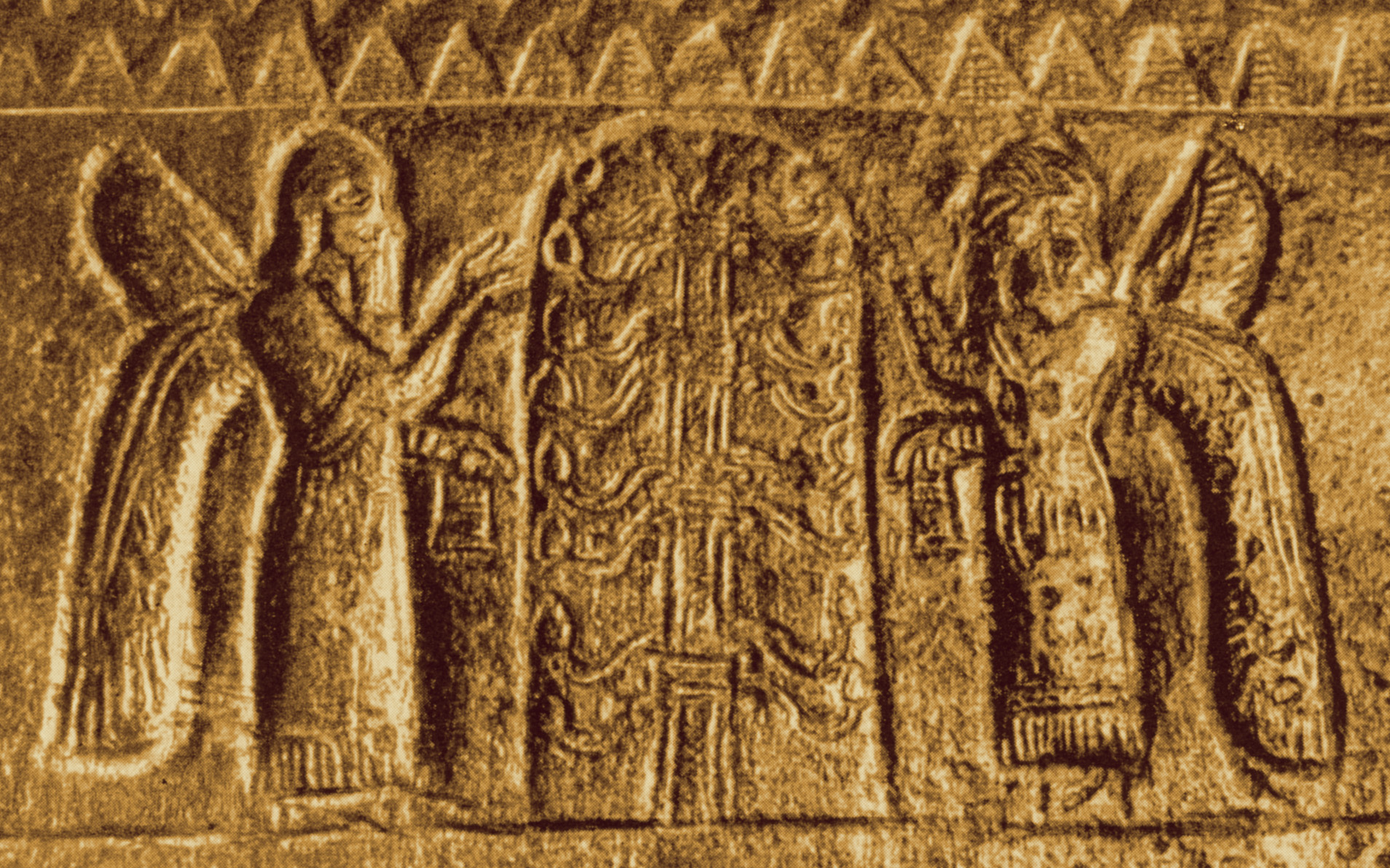
The Urartian tree of life

The tree of life appears in Asherah iconography, particularly on the Lachish ewer and Pithos A from Kuntillet Ajrud, where it is flanked by ibexes. The tree's design, with buds, flowers, and possibly almond drupes, resembles the menorah, which is thought to represent a stylized almond tree in Exodus 25:31-36 This suggests a continuation of Asherah's cultic representation in the temple. Scholars have explored these connections, noting parallels between sacred trees, Asherah, and the menorah.

==== Urartu ====
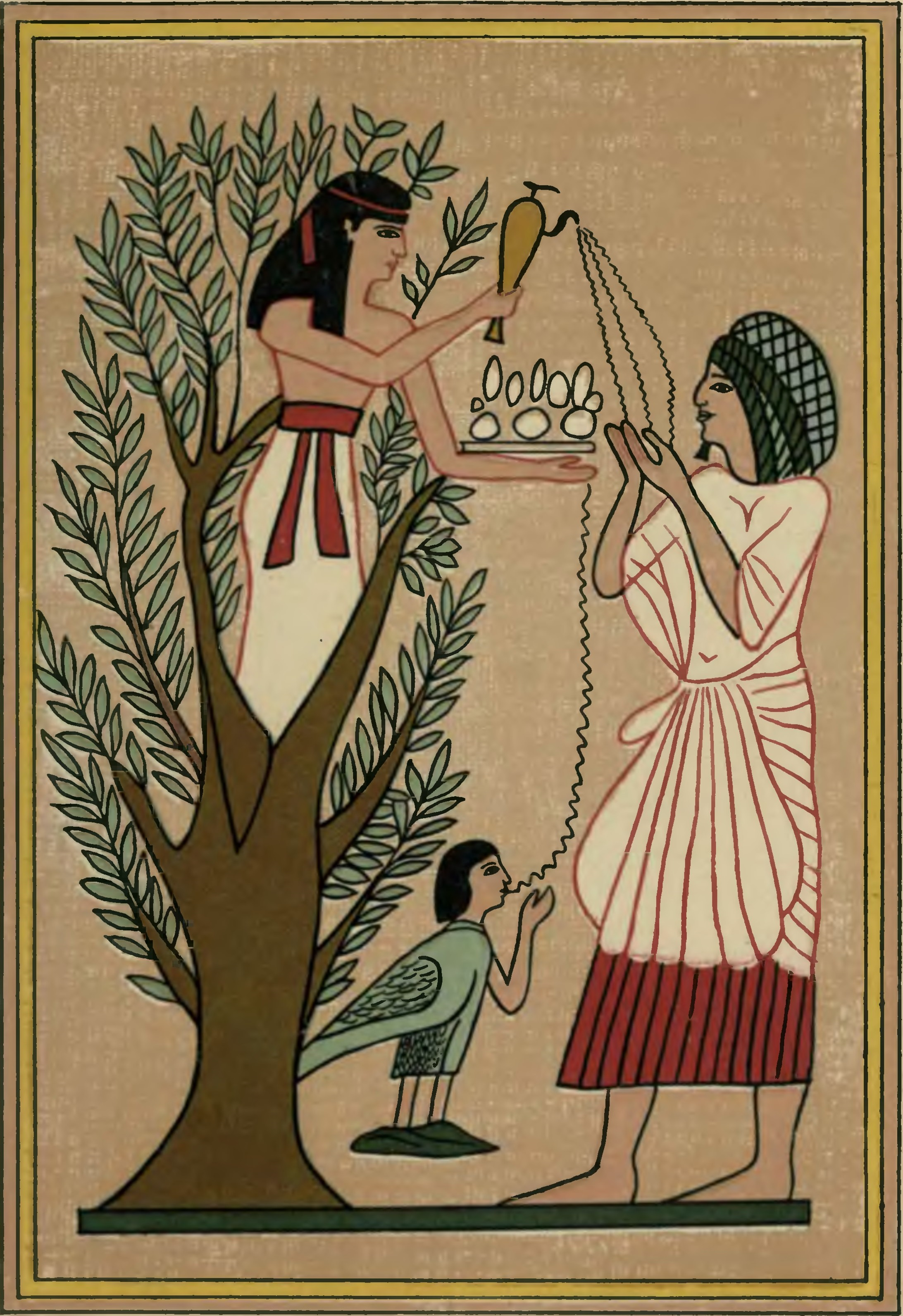
Goddess Nut as a sycamore tree assisting a soul in the afterlife.

In Urartu in the Armenian highlands, the tree of life was a religious symbol and was drawn on walls of fortresses and carved on the armor of warriors. The branches of the tree were equally divided on the right and left sides of the stem, with each branch having one leaf, and one leaf on the apex of the tree. Servants stood on each side of the tree with one of their hands up as if they are taking care of the tree.

=== Ancient Egypt ===
In Egypt, tree and plant symbolism carried a sense of eternal nutrition and sustenance in the afterlife. The sky goddess Nut was at times depicted as a sycamore tree giving food and water to the deceased. Many trees were included sacred, which includes the Nile acacia, Christ's thorn, Persia tree, perisa, Egyptian willow, sycamore, tamarisk, palm, doum palm and date palm. Isis and Hathor were also associated with the sycamore, while Osiris and Thoth the Persia and Ished trees.

The corpus of Egyptian writings in one of the few ancient civilizations where the phrase and name of "tree of life" directly occurs. In the Great Cairo Hymn of Praise to Amun-Re, Amun-Ra is praised for creating the Tree of Life, in the Great Hymn of Osiris it is seen as a life giving agent. It is found in the Pyramid Texts, Book of the Dead, and other literature, representing a fruitful life in this world and eternal life after death, addressing the desire for immortality.

=== Ancient Iran ===
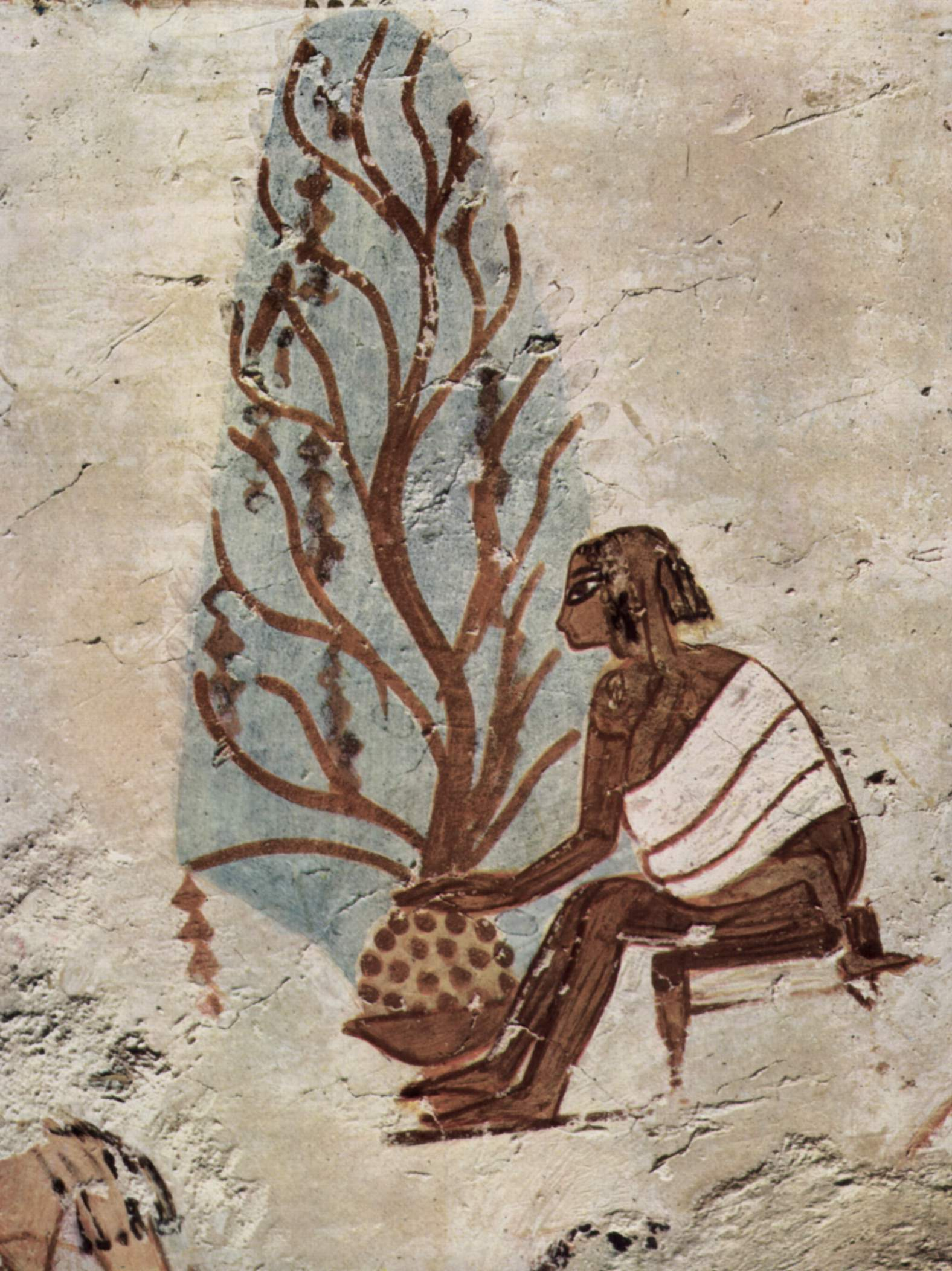
Breastfeeding before an Egyptian "sycamore"

In the Avestan literature and Iranian mythology, there are several sacred vegetal icons related to life, eternality and cure, such as Amesha Spenta; Ameretat, the guardian of plants and goddess of trees and immortality; Gaokerena or white haoma, a tree that its vivacity would certify continuance of life in the universe; the bas tokhmak, a tree with remedial attribute, retentive of all herbal seeds, and destroyer of sorrow; Mashya and Mashyana, the parents of the human race; barsom, copped offshoots of pomegranate, gaz (Tamarix gallica), or haoma that Zoroastrians use in their rituals; and haoma, a plant, unknown today, that was the source of sacred potable.

The Gaokerena is a large, sacred haoma planted by Ahura Mazda. Ahriman created a frog to invade and destroy the tree, aiming to prevent all trees from growing on the earth. As a reaction, Ahura Mazda created two kar-fish staring at the frog to guard the tree. The two fish always stare at the frog and stay ready to react to it. Ahriman is responsible for all evil, including death; Ahura Mazda is responsible for all good (including life).

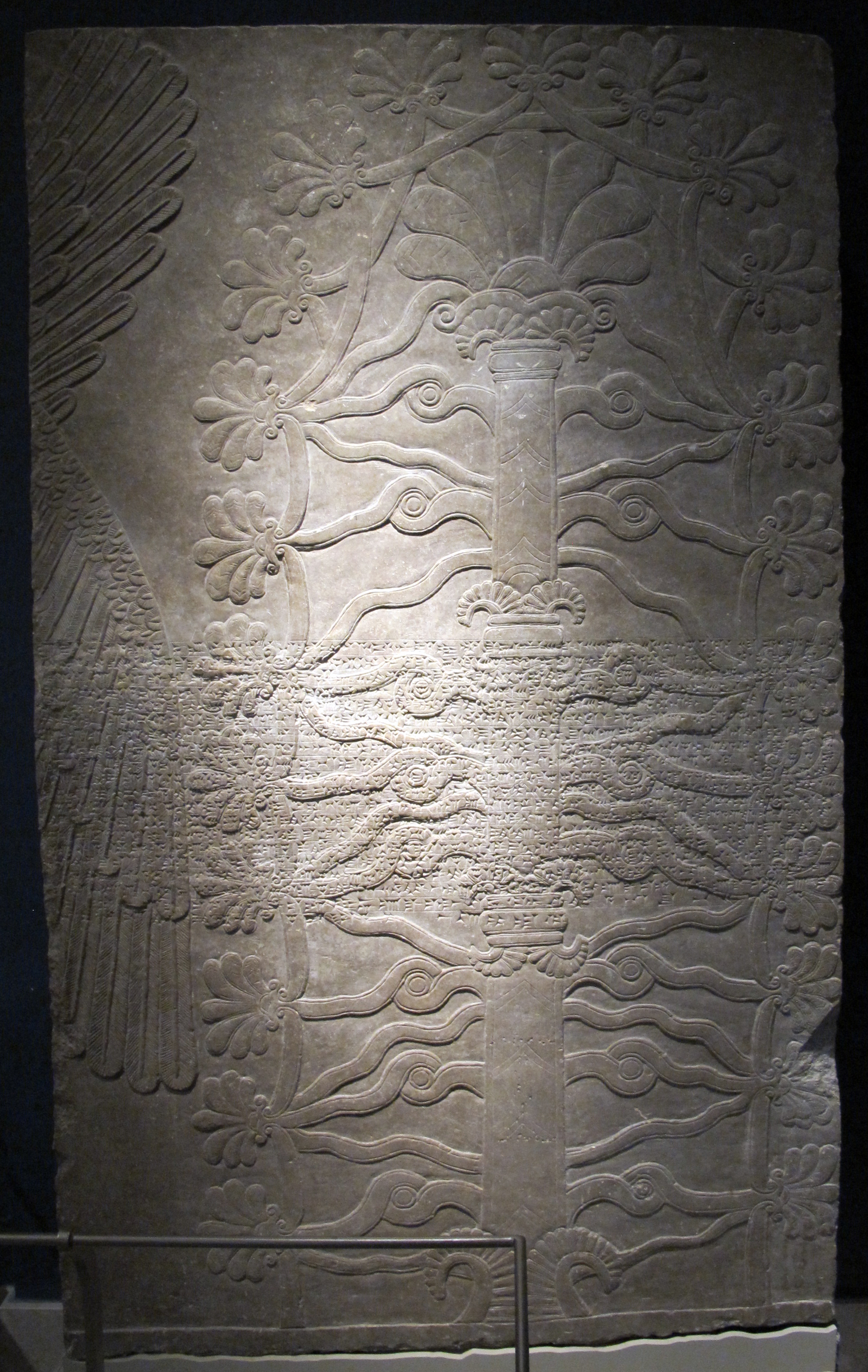
Assyrian tree of life, from Nimrud panels

Haoma is another sacred plant because of the drink made from it. Preparing the drink by pounding and drinking it is a central feature of Zoroastrian ritual. Haoma is also personified as a divinity. It bestows essential qualities—health, fertility, husbands for maidens, and even immortality. The source of the earthly haoma plant is a shining white tree that grows on a paradisiacal mountain. Sprigs of this white haoma were brought to earth by divine birds. The tree is considerably diverse.

Haoma is the Avestan form of the Sanskrit soma. The identity of the two in ritual significance is considered by scholars to point to a salient feature of an Indo-Iranian religion antedating Zoroastrianism.

Another related issue in Persian mythology is Mashya and Mashyana, two trees that were the ancestors of all living beings. This myth is a prototype for the creation myth, in which gods create living beings.

=== Hinduism ===
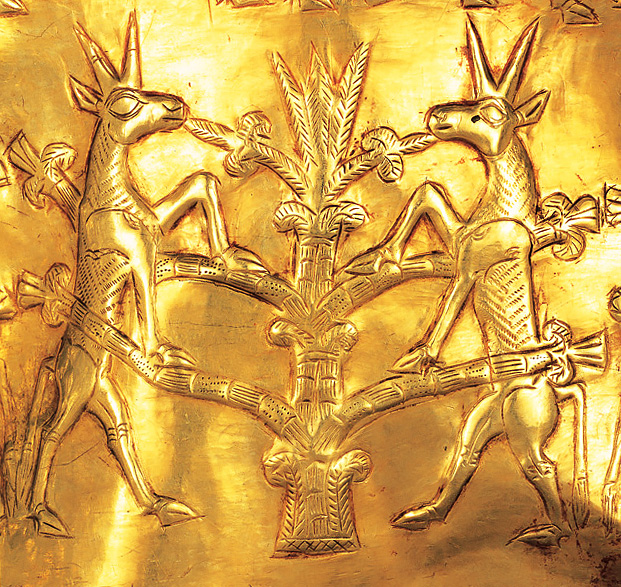
Tree of life on a rhyton from Marlik, Iran, currently at the National Museum of Iran

A genre of the sacred books of Hinduism, the Puranas, mention a divine tree called the Kalpavriksha. This divine tree is guarded by gandharvas in the garden of the mythological city of Amaravati under the control of Indra, the king of the devas. In one story, for a very long time, the devas and the asuras decided to churn the milky ocean to obtain amrita, the nectar of immortality, and share it equally. During the churning, along with many other mythical items, emerged the Kalpavriksha. It is described to be gold in colour and bear a mesmerising aura. It is said to be pleased with chanting and offers: when it is pleased, it grants every wish. Hindu tradition holds that there are five separate kalpavrikshas and each of them grant different types of wishes. These trees also appear in the beliefs of Jainism.

=== Chinese mythology ===
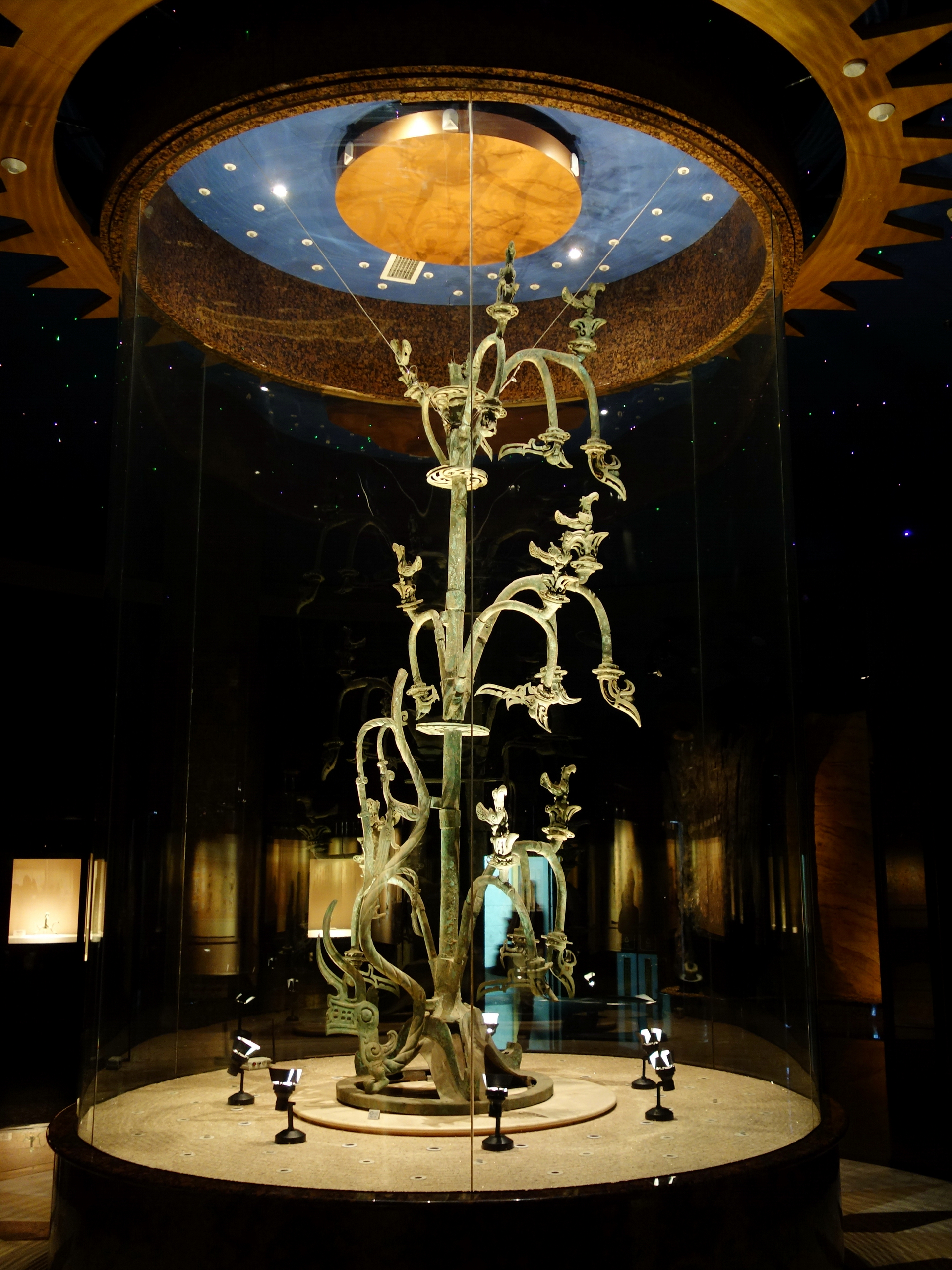
Bronze Tree with birds, flowers, and ornaments from Sanxingdui

In Chinese mythology, a carving of a tree of life depicts a phoenix and a dragon; the dragon often represents immortality. A Taoist story tells of a tree that produces a peach of immortality every three thousand years, and anyone who eats the fruit receives immortality.

An archaeological discovery in the 1990s was of a sacrificial pit at Sanxingdui in Sichuan, China. Dating from about 1200 BCE, it contained three bronze trees, one of them 4 meters high. At the base was a dragon, and fruit hanging from the lower branches. At the top is a bird-like (Phoenix) creature with claws. Also found in Sichuan, from the late Han dynasty (c. 25–220 CE), is another tree of life. The ceramic base is guarded by a horned beast with wings. The leaves of the tree represent coins and people. At the apex is a bird with coins and the Sun.

=== Christianity ===
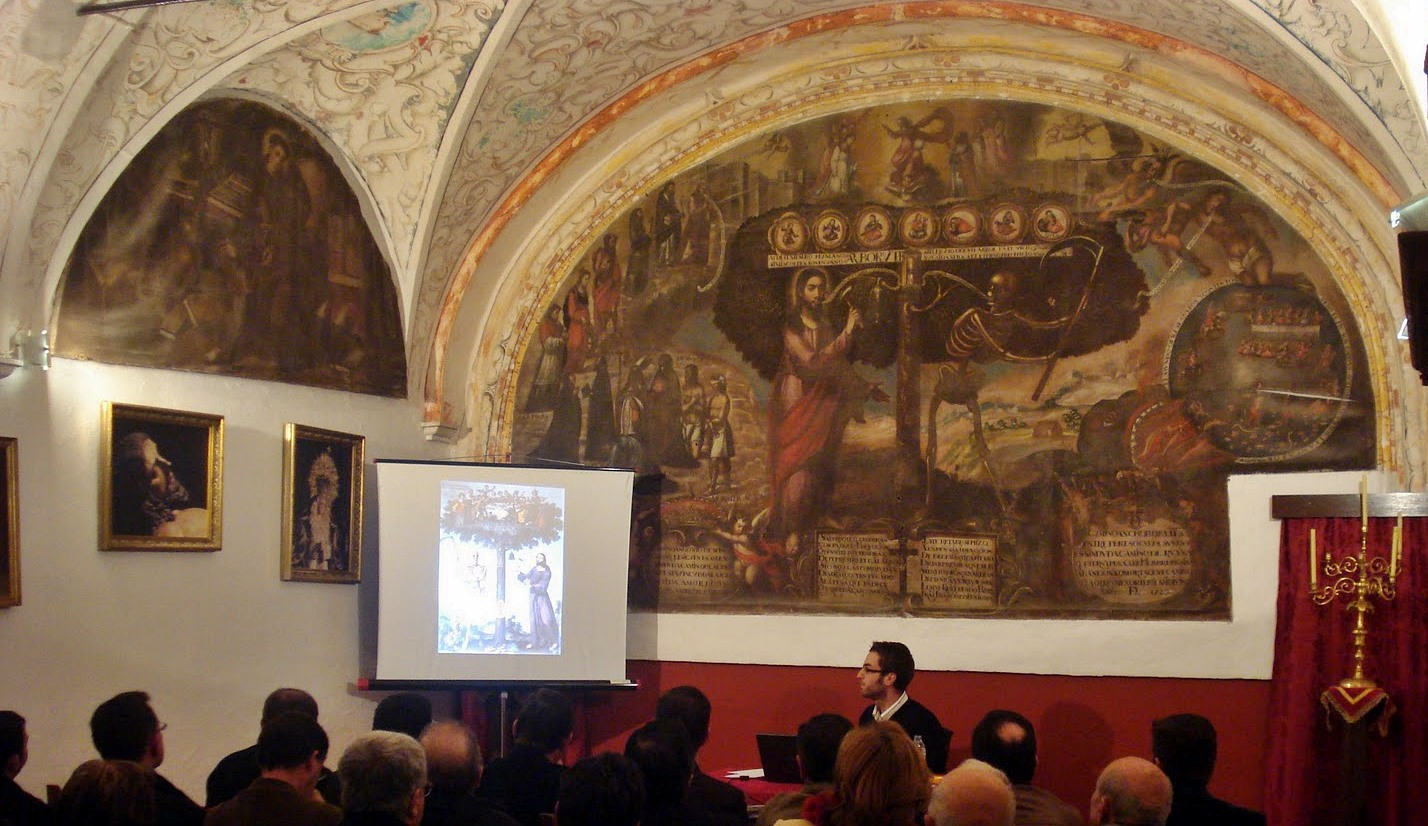
Allegorical painting of the Tree of Life in the Church of San Roque of Arahal (Seville). Oil on canvas by anonymous author. Dated 1723

The tree of life first appears in Genesis 2:9 and 3:22–24 as the source of eternal life in the Garden of Eden, from which access is revoked when man is driven from the garden. It then reappears in the last book of the Bible, the Book of Revelation, and most predominantly in the last chapter of that book (Chapter 22) as a part of the new garden of paradise in New Jerusalem. Access is then no longer forbidden, for those who "wash their robes" (or as the textual variant in the King James Version has it, "they that do his commandments") "have right to the tree of life" (v. 14). A similar statement appears in Rev 2:7, where the tree of life is promised as a reward to those who overcome. Revelation 22 begins with a reference to the "pure river of water of life" which proceeds "out of the throne of God". The river seems to feed two trees of life, one "on either side of the river" which "bear twelve manner of fruits" "and the leaves of the tree were for healing of the nations" (v. 1–2). Alternatively, this may indicate that the tree of life is a vine that grows on both sides of the river, as John 15:1 would hint at.

Pope Benedict XVI has said that "the Cross is the true tree of life." Saint Bonaventure taught that the medicinal fruit of the tree of life is Christ himself. Saint Albert the Great taught that the Eucharist, the Body and Blood of Christ, is the Fruit of the Tree of Life. Augustine of Hippo said that the tree of life is Christ:

All these things stood for something other than what they were, but all the same they were themselves bodily realities. And when the narrator mentioned them he was not employing figurative language, but giving an explicit account of things which had a forward reference that was figurative. So then the tree of life also was Christ... and indeed God did not wish the man to live in Paradise without the mysteries of spiritual things being presented to him in bodily form. So then in the other trees he was provided with nourishment, in this one with a sacrament... He is rightly called whatever came before him in order to signify him.

In Eastern Christianity the tree of life is the love of God.

==== The Church of Jesus Christ of Latter-day Saints ====
The tree of life vision is described and discussed in the Book of Mormon. According to the Book of Mormon, the vision was received in a dream by the prophet Lehi, and later in a vision by his son Nephi, who wrote about it in the First Book of Nephi. The vision includes a path leading to a tree, the fruit of the tree symbolizing the love of God, with an iron rod, symbolizing the word of God, along the path whereby followers of Jesus may hold to the rod and avoid wandering off the path into pits or waters symbolizing the ways of sin. The vision also includes a large building wherein the wicked look down at the righteous and mock them.

The vision is said to symbolize love of Christ and the way to eternal life and is a well known and cited story with members of The Church of Jesus Christ of Latter-day Saints. A member of the church reflected that the vision is "one of the richest, most flexible, and far-reaching pieces of symbolic prophecy contained in the standard works [scriptures]."

==== Nag Hammadi Gnosticism ====
Different views on the Tree of life can be found in the Nag Hammadi library codices, writings belonging to Gnosticism. In On the Origin of the World, the Tree of Life is said to be located to the north of paradise, providing life to the innocent saints who will come out of their material bodies during what is called the consummation of the age. The color of the tree is described as resembling the Sun, its branches are beautiful, its leaves are similar to that of cypress, and its fruit is like clusters of white grapes. However, in the Secret Book of John, the Tree of Life is portrayed negatively. Its roots are described as bitter, its branches are death, its shadow is hatred, a trap is found in its leaves, its seed is desire, and it blossoms in the darkness.

=== Manichaeism ===
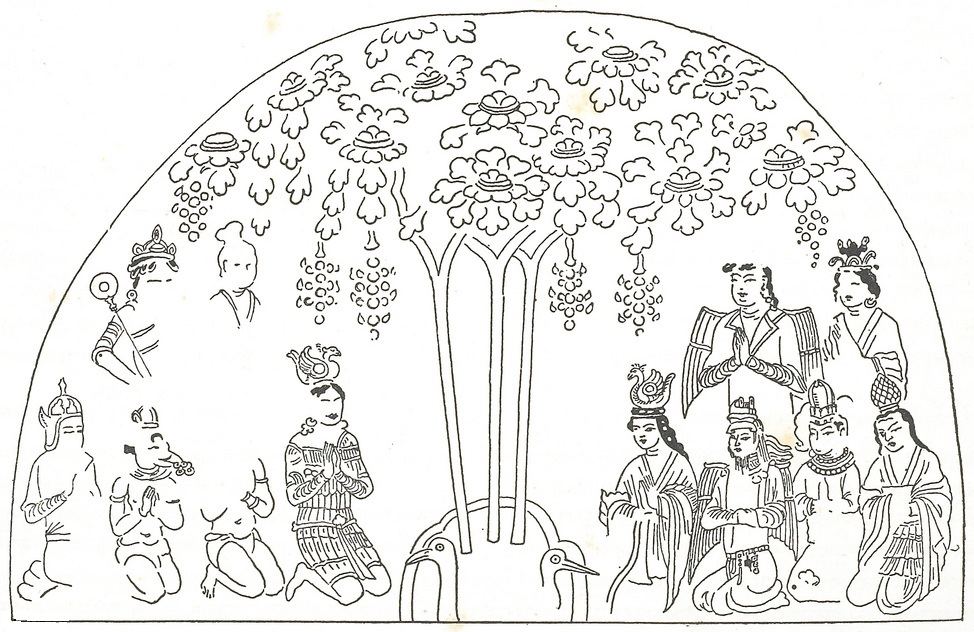
Manichaeans worshiping the Tree of Life in the Realm of Light. Mid 9th – early 11th century.

In the Gnostic religion Manichaeism, the Tree of Life helped Adam obtain the knowledge (gnosis) necessary for salvation and is identified as an image of Jesus.

=== Europe ===
In Greek mythology, Hera is gifted a branch growing golden apples by her grandmother Gaia, which are then planted in Hera's Garden of the Hesperides. The dragon Ladon guards the tree(s) from all who would take the apples. The three golden apples that Aphrodite gave to Hippomenes to distract Atalanta three times during their footrace allowed him to win Atalanta's hand in marriage. Though it is not specified in ancient myth, many assume that Aphrodite gathered those apples from Hera's tree(s). Eris stole one of these apples and carved the words ΤΗΙ ΚΑΛΛΙΣΤΗΙ, "to the fairest", upon it to create the Apple of Discord. Heracles retrieved three of the apples as the eleventh of his Twelve Labors. The Garden of the Hesperides is often compared to Eden, the golden apples are compared to the forbidden fruit of the tree in Genesis, and Ladon is often compared to the snake in Eden, all of which is part of why the forbidden fruit of Eden is usually represented as an apple in European art, even though Genesis does not specifically name nor describe any characteristics of the fruit.

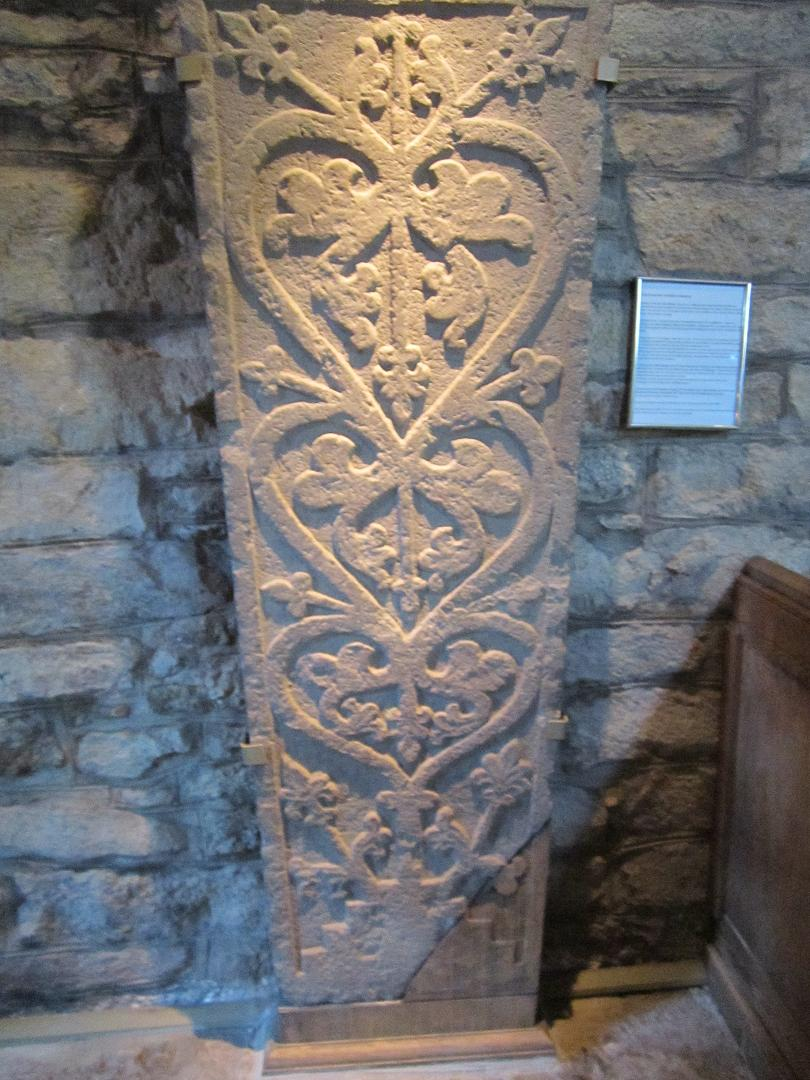
11th century tree of life sculpture at an ancient Swedish church

In Dictionnaire Mytho-Hermetique (Paris, 1737), Antoine-Joseph Pernety, a famous alchemist, identified the tree of life with the Elixir of life and the Philosopher's Stone.

In Eden in the East (1998), Stephen Oppenheimer suggests that a tree-worshipping culture arose in Indonesia and was diffused by the so-called Younger Dryas event of c. 10,900 BCE or 12,900 BP, after which the sea level rose. This culture reached China (Sichuan), then India and the Middle East. Finally the Finno-Ugric strand of this diffusion spread through Russia to Finland where the Norse myth of Yggdrasil took root.

=== Georgia ===
The Borjgali (Georgian: ბორჯღალი) is an ancient Georgian tree of life symbol.

=== Germanic paganism and Norse mythology ===
In Germanic paganism, trees played (and, in the form of reconstructive Heathenry and Germanic Neopaganism, continue to play) a prominent role, appearing in various aspects of surviving texts and possibly in the name of gods.

The tree of life appears in Norse religion as Yggdrasil, the world tree, a massive tree (sometimes considered a yew or ash tree) with extensive lore surrounding it. Perhaps related to Yggdrasil, accounts have survived of Germanic Tribes honouring sacred trees within their societies. Examples include Thor's Oak, sacred groves, the Sacred tree at Uppsala, and the wooden Irminsul pillar. In Norse Mythology, the apples from Iðunn's ash box provide immortality for the gods.

=== Islam ===
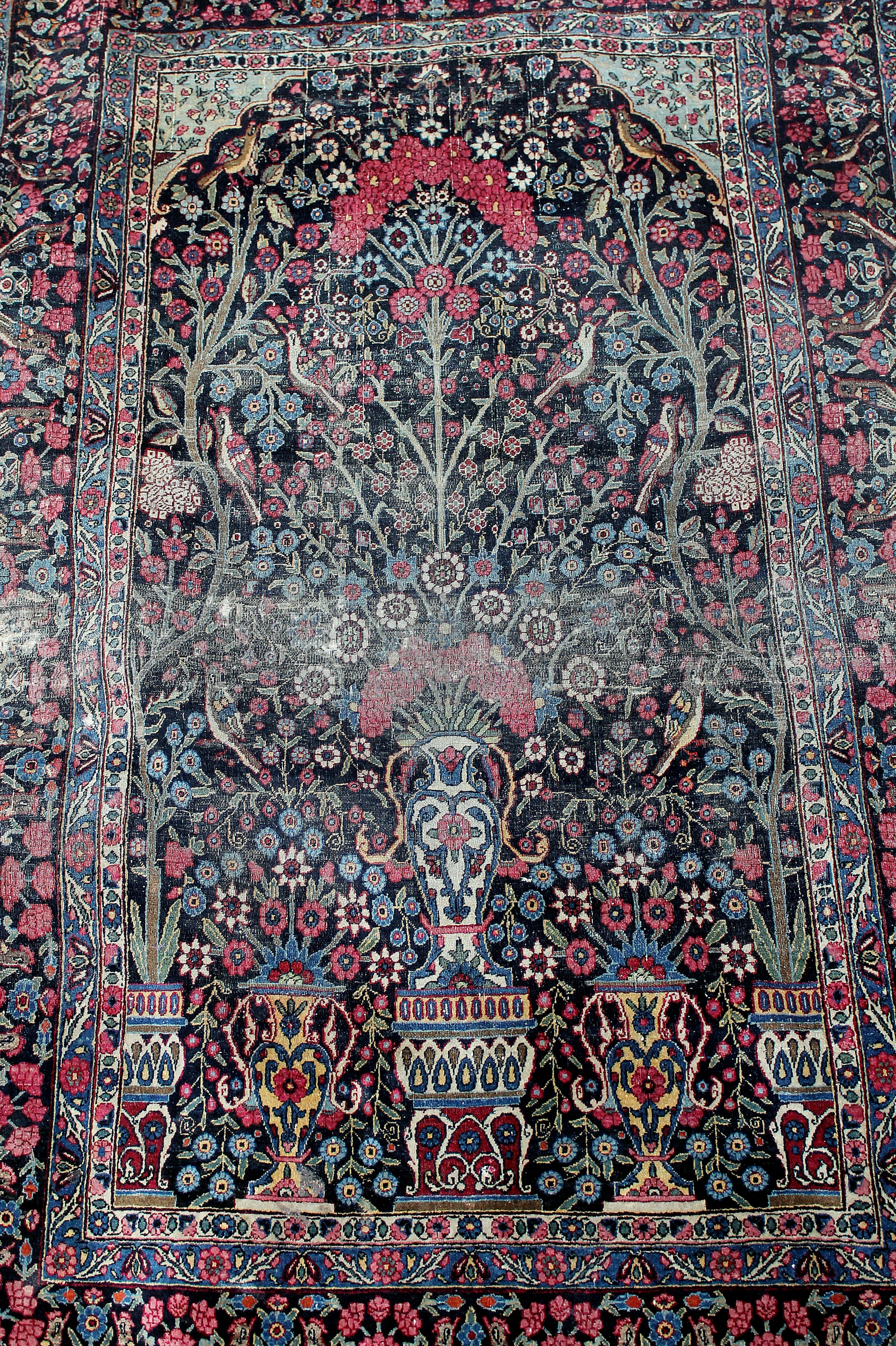
Carpet tree of life Iran

The "Tree of Immortality" (Arabic: شجرة الخلود) is the tree of life motif as it appears in the Quran. It is also alluded to in hadiths and tafsir. Unlike the biblical account, the Quran mentions only one tree in Eden, also called " the tree of immortality and power that never decays", which God specifically forbade to Adam and Eve.

The tree in Quran is used as an example of a concept, idea, way of life or code of life. A good concept/idea is represented as a good tree and a bad idea/concept is represented as a bad tree Muslims believe that when God created Adam and Eve, he told them that they could enjoy everything in the Garden except this tree (idea, concept, way of life). Satan appeared to them and told them that the only reason God forbade them to eat from that tree was that they would become angels or they start using the idea/concept of Ownership in conjunction with inheritance generations after generations which Iblis convinced Adam to accept

When Adam and Eve ate from this tree their nakedness appeared to them and they began to sew together, for their covering, leaves from the Garden.

The hadiths also speak about other trees in heaven.

The tree of life in Islamic architecture is a type of biomorphic pattern found in many artistic traditions. It is considered to be any vegetal pattern with a clear origin or growth. The pattern in al-Azhar Mosque, Cairo's mihrab, a unique Fatimid architectural variation, is a series of two or three leave palmettes with a central palmette of five leaves from which the pattern originates. The growth is upwards and outwards and culminates in a lantern like flower towards the top of the niche above which is a small roundel. The curvature of the niche accentuates the undulating movement which despite its complexity is symmetrical along its vertical axis. The representations of varying palm leaves hints to spiritual growth attained through prayer while the upwards and side wards movement of the leaves speaks to the different motions of the worshiper while in salah.

==== Ahmadiyya ====
According to the Indian Ahmadiyya movement founded in 1889, Quranic reference to the tree is symbolic; eating of the forbidden tree signifies that Adam disobeyed God.

=== Jewish sources ===
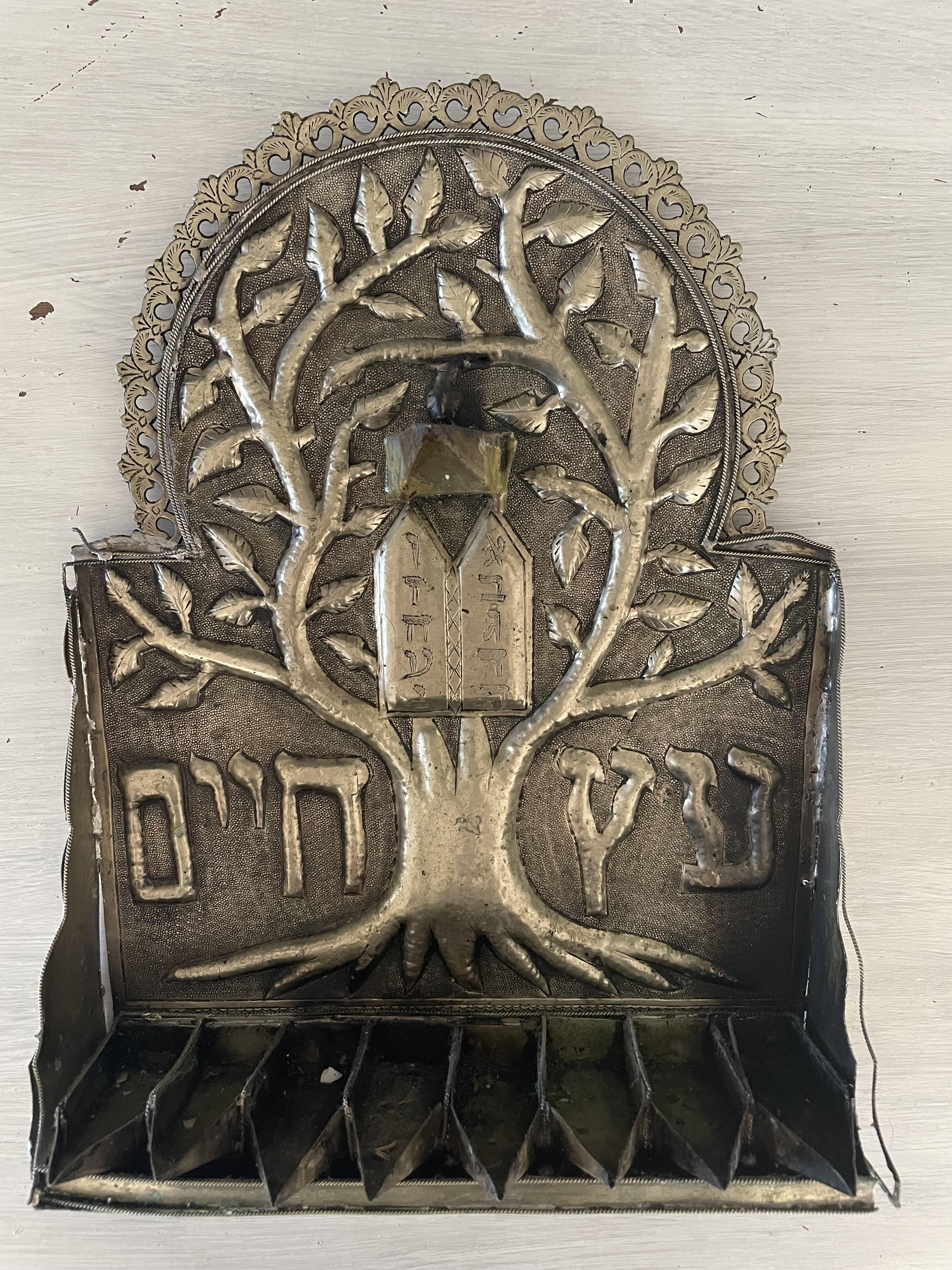
Moroccan hanukkiah with Tree of Life (Etz Chaim) motif

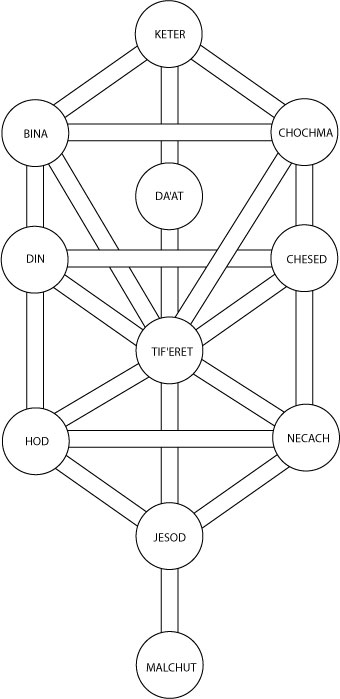
Judaic Kabbalah tree of life 10 Sefirot, through which the Ein Sof unknowable divine manifests Creation. The configuration relates to the first human.

Etz Chaim (Hebrew: עץ חיים), Hebrew for "tree of life," appears in the Book of Genesis and is part of the story of the creation of Adam and Eve in the Garden of Eden. Thus the term is a common term used in Judaism. The expression, found in the Book of Proverbs, is figuratively applied to the Torah itself. Etz Chaim is also a common name for yeshivas and synagogues as well as for works of Rabbinic literature. It is also used to describe each of the wooden poles to which the parchment of a Sefer Torah is attached.

The tree of life is mentioned in the Book of Genesis; it is distinct from the tree of the knowledge of good and evil. After Adam and Eve disobeyed God by eating fruit from the tree of the knowledge of good and evil, they were driven out of the Garden of Eden. Remaining in the garden, however, was the tree of life. To prevent their access to this tree in the future, cherubim with a flaming sword were placed at the east of the garden.

In the Book of Proverbs, the tree of life is associated with wisdom: "[Wisdom] is a tree of life to them that lay hold upon her, and happy [is every one] that retaineth her." In Proverbs 15:4, the tree of life is associated with calmness: "A soothing tongue is a tree of life; but perverseness therein is a wound to the spirit."

In the Ashkenazic liturgy, the Eitz Chayim is a piyyut commonly sung as the Sefer Torah is returned to the Torah ark.

The Book of Enoch, generally considered non-canonical, states that in the time of the great judgment, God will give all those whose names are in the Book of Life fruit to eat from the tree of life.

==== Kabbalah ====
Jewish mysticism depicts the tree of life in the form of ten interconnected nodes, as the central symbol of the Kabbalah. It comprises the ten Sefirot powers in the divine realm. The panentheistic and anthropomorphic emphasis of this emanationist theology interpreted the Torah, Jewish observance, and the purpose of Creation as the symbolic esoteric drama of unification in the sefirot, restoring harmony to Creation.

From the Renaissance onwards, Kabbalah became incorporated as tradition in Christian Western esotericism as Hermetic Qabalah.

=== Mandaeism ===
Mandaean scrolls often include abstract illustrations of trees of life that represent the living, interconnected nature of the cosmos. One of these trees is given the name of Shatrin.

=== Mesoamerica ===
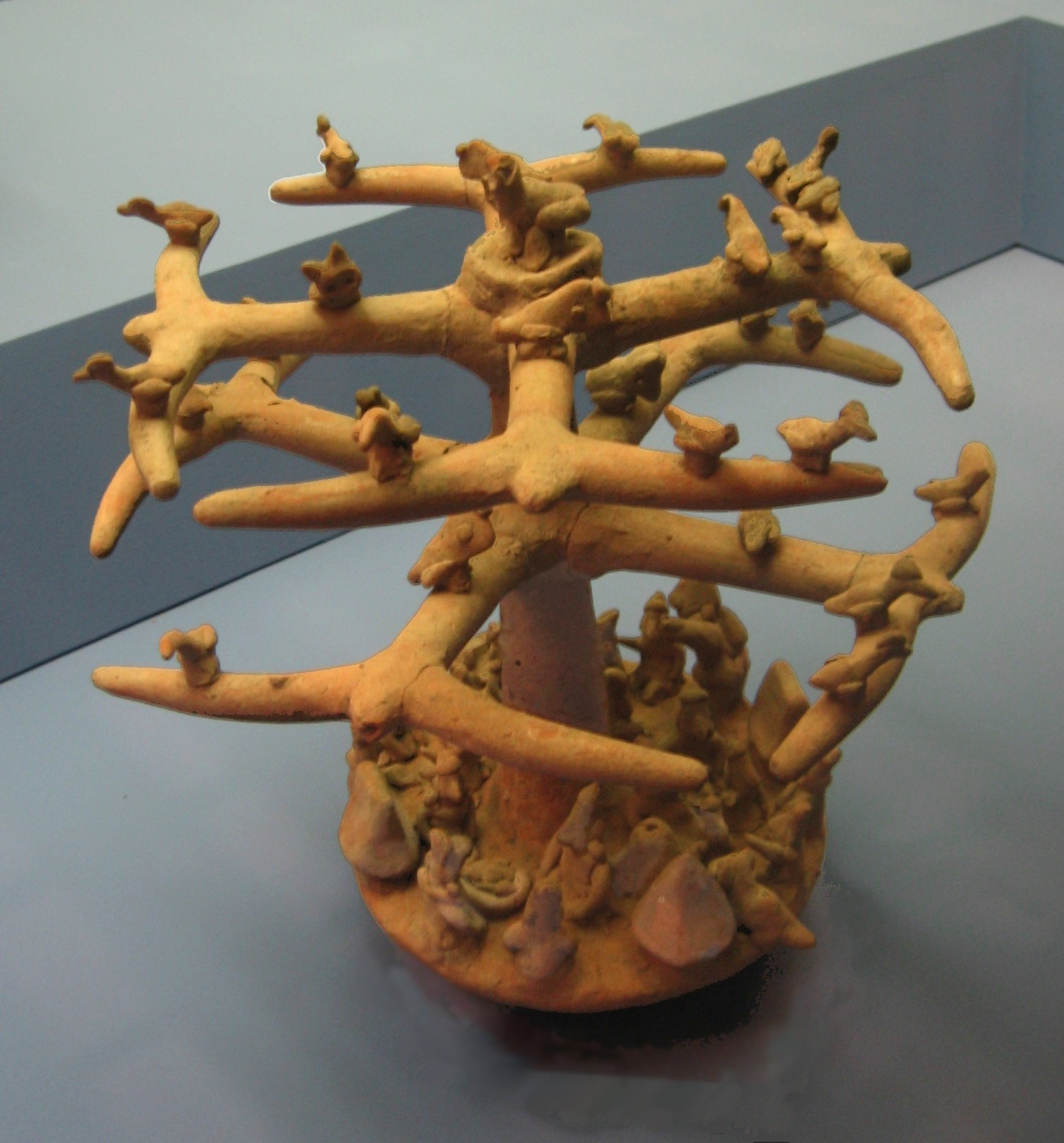
A tableau from the Western Mexico shaft tomb tradition, showing a multi-layered tree with birds. It has been proposed that the birds represent souls who have not yet descended into the underworld, while the central tree may represent the Mesoamerican world tree.

The concept of world trees is a prevalent motif in the Mesoamerican cosmovision and iconography, appearing in the pre-Columbian era. World trees embody the four cardinal directions, which represented also the fourfold nature of a central world tree, a symbolic axis mundi connecting the planes of the Underworld and the sky with that of the terrestrial world.

Depictions of world trees, both in their directional and central aspects, are found in the art and mythological traditions of cultures such as the Maya, Aztec, Izapan, Mixtec, Olmec, and others, dating to at least the Mid/Late Formative periods of the Mesoamerican chronology. The tomb of Kʼinich Janaabʼ Pakal of the Maya city-state of Palenque, who became its ajaw or leader when he was twelve years old, has tree of life inscriptions within the walls of his burial place, showing just how important it was. Among the Maya, the central world tree was conceived as or represented by a Ceiba pentandra and is known variously as a wacah chan or yax imix che in different Mayan languages.

The trunk of the tree could also be represented by an upright caiman, whose skin evokes the tree's spiny trunk.

Directional world trees are also associated with the four Year Bearers in Mesoamerican calendars and associated with the directional colors and deities. Mesoamerican codices which have this association outlined include the Dresden, Borgia and Fejérváry-Mayer codices. It is supposed that Mesoamerican sites and ceremonial centers frequently had actual trees planted at each of the four cardinal directions, representing the quadripartite concept.

World trees are frequently depicted with birds in their branches, and their roots extending into earth or water, sometimes atop a "water-monster," symbolic of the underworld. The central world tree has also been interpreted as a representation of the band of the Milky Way.

=== Northern America ===
In a myth passed down among the Iroquois, The World on the Turtle's Back, explains the origin of the land in which a tree of life is described. According to the myth, it is found in the heavens, where the first humans lived, until a pregnant woman fell and landed in an endless sea. Saved by a giant turtle from drowning, she formed the world on its back by planting bark taken from the tree.

The tree of life motif is present in the traditional Ojibwe cosmology and traditions. It is sometimes described as Grandmother Cedar, or Nookomis Giizhig in Anishinaabemowin.

In the book Black Elk Speaks, Black Elk, an Oglala Lakota (Sioux) wičháša wakȟáŋ (medicine man and holy man), describes his vision in which after dancing around a dying tree that has never bloomed he is transported to the other world (spirit world) where he meets wise elders, 12 men and 12 women. The elders tell Black Elk that they will bring him to meet "Our Father, the two-legged chief" and bring him to the center of a hoop where he sees the tree in full leaf and bloom and the "chief" standing against the tree. Coming out of his trance he hopes to see that the earthly tree has bloomed, but it is dead.

The Oneidas tell that supernatural beings lived in the Skyworld above the waters which covered the earth. This tree was covered with fruits which gave them their light, and they were instructed that no one should cut into the tree otherwise a great punishment would be given. As the woman had pregnancy cravings, she sent her husband to get bark, but he accidentally dug a hole to the other world. After falling through, she came to rest on the turtle's back, and four animals were sent out to find land, which the muskrat finally did.

=== Serer religion ===
In Serer religion, the tree of life as a religious concept forms the basis of Serer cosmogony. Trees were the first things created on Earth by the supreme being Roog ("Koox" among the Cangin). In the competing versions of the Serer creation myth, the Somb (Anonychium africana) and the Saas tree (Faidherbia albida) are both viewed as trees of life. However, the prevailing view is that, the Somb was the first tree on Earth and the progenitor of plant life. The Somb was also used in the Serer tumuli and burial chambers, many of which have survived for more than a thousand years. Thus, Somb is not only the tree of life in Serer society but the symbol of immortality.

=== Turkic ===
The tree of life, as seen as in flag of Chuvashia, a Turkic state in the Russian Federation

Logo of the Ministry of Culture and Tourism of Turkey represents the Tree of Life.

The tree of life connects the upper world, middle world and underworld. It is also imagined as the "white creator lord" (yryn-al-tojon), thus synonymous with the creator deity, giving rise to different worlds.

The world tree or tree of life is an important symbol in Turkic mythology. It is a common motif in carpets. It is used in the logo of the Ministry of Culture and Tourism (Turkey) and in 2009 it was introduced as the main design of the common Turkish lira sub-unit 5 kuruş.

Tree of life is known as Ulukayın or Baiterek in Turkic communities. It is a sacred beech tree planted by Kayra Han. Sometimes, it is considered axis mundi.

=== Baháʼí Faith ===
The concept of the tree of life appears in the writings of the Baháʼí Faith, where it can refer to the Manifestation of God, a great teacher who appears to humanity from age to age. An example of this can be found in the Hidden Words of Bahá'u'lláh:

Have ye forgotten that true and radiant morn, when in those hallowed and blessed surroundings ye were all gathered in My presence beneath the shade of the tree of life, which is planted in the all-glorious paradise? Awestruck ye listened as I gave utterance to these three most holy words: O friends! Prefer not your will to Mine, never desire that which I have not desired for you, and approach Me not with lifeless hearts, defiled with worldly desires and cravings. Would ye but sanctify your souls, ye would at this present hour recall that place and those surroundings, and the truth of My utterance should be made evident unto all of you.

Also, in the Tablet of Ahmad of Bahá'u'lláh: "Verily He is the Tree of Life, that bringeth forth the fruits of God, the Exalted, the Powerful, the Great".

Bahá'u'lláh refers to his male descendants as branches (Arabic: ﺍﻏﺼﺎﻥ ʾaghṣān) and calls women leaves.

A distinction has been made between the tree of life and the tree of the knowledge of good and evil. The latter represents the physical world with its opposites, such as good and evil and light and dark. In a different context from the one above, the tree of life represents the spiritual realm, where this duality does not exist.

== Science perspective ==
In contemporary biology, the "tree of life" is a graphical shorthand for the historical pattern of descent with modification across organisms, not a ladder of progress. Stephen Jay Gould emphasized that trees should be read as branching genealogies rather than hierarchies culminating in humans, and he analyzed how different tree iconographies shape scientific and public thinking about evolution.

== In art and film ==
Austrian symbolist artist Gustav Klimt portrayed his version of the tree of life in his 1909 painting, The Tree of Life, Stoclet Frieze. It later inspired the external facade of the "New Residence Hall" (also called the "Tree House"), a colorful 21-story student residence hall at Massachusetts College of Art and Design in Boston, Massachusetts.

In his 1927 novella Kappa (Japanese: 河童) Japanese author Ryūnosuke Akutagawa wrote of a fictitious religion called 'Lifeism' whose adherents believe their God, the Tree of Life, teaches them to 'live avidly'.

The 2006 Darren Aronofsky film The Fountain features the Judeo-Christian tree of life as a major plot element in its non-linear narrative. In Central America during the Age of Discovery, it is the sought-after object of a Spanish conquistador, who believes its gift of eternal life will free Spain and its queen from the tyranny of a religious inquisition. In the present day, a sample from what is implied to be the same tree of life is used by a medical researcher—who seeks a cure for his ailing wife—to develop a serum that reverses the biological aging process. In the distant future, a space traveler (implied to be the same man from the present) uses the last vestiges of a tree's bark (again, implied to be the same tree of life) to keep himself alive as he journeys to Xibalba, a fictional dying star lying inside a nebula in the constellation Orion, which he believes will rejuvenate the tree—thereby granting him eternal life—when it explodes.

Alex Proyas' 2009 film Knowing ends with the two young protagonists directed towards the tree of life.

There are literal and thematic references to the tree in Terrence Malick's free-flowing 2011 film The Tree of Life, including in the title.

The 2021 adventure film Jungle Cruise follows a boat captain (Dwayne Johnson) who takes a scientist (Emily Blunt) on a quest to find the Tree.

In The Lion Guard, Kion and the Lion Guard traveled to the Tree of Life in Asia, to heal his scar and Ono's eyesight.

== Physical "trees of life" ==
- In West Africa, the South Asian Moringa oleifera tree is regarded as a "tree of life" or "miracle tree" by some because it is arguably the most nutritious source of plant-derived food discovered on the planet. Modern scientists and some missionary groups have considered the plant as a possible solution for the treatment of severe malnutrition and aid for those with HIV/AIDS.

== See also ==
- Christmas tree
- Flag of Chuvashia
- Holism
- Maypole
- New Year tree
- Tree of the knowledge of good and evil
- Tree of life (Biology)
