= Bucket and cone =

Attributes in Mesopotamian art

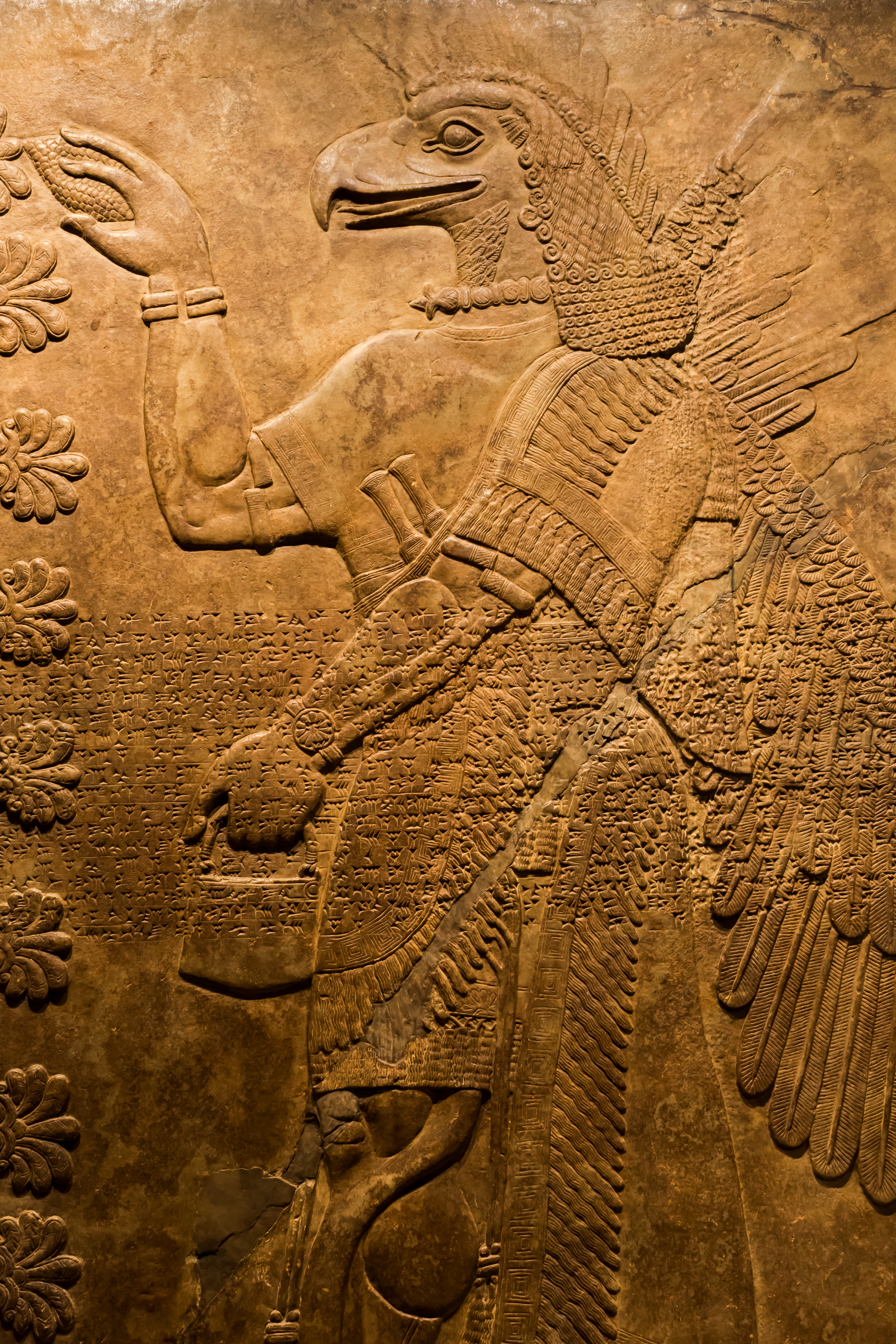
An Eagle headed protective spirit holding the bucket and cone

Bucket and cone refer to twin attributes that are frequently held in the hands of winged genies depicted in the art of Mesopotamia, and within the context of Ancient Mesopotamian religion. The iconography is particularly frequent in art from the Neo-Assyrian Empire (911–605 BCE), and especially Assyrian palace reliefs from this period. In some instances, only the bucket is held and the other hand is held up in what may be a blessing gesture. To a lesser degree such images were also depicted in images from the Neo-Sumerian Empire, Old Assyrian Empire, Babylonian Empire, and Middle Assyrian Empire.

== Context ==
These objects are often displayed in association with a stylised tree, before floral decorations, guardian figures, the king and / or his attendants and open doorways or portals. The cone was apparently held up in the right hand, the bucket held hanging downwards in the left hand of the figure, which is almost always that of a winged genie or an animal-headed demon or mythical composite (similar to the demon antagonist Anzû, though not necessarily with the same malicious connotations); only very occasionally might these attributes be borne by a fully human figure.

== Identity ==
As to the identity of the twin objects, the "cone" is generally recognised as a Turkish pine cone (Pinus brutia), common in Assyria. Other common identifications suggest the male inflorescence of the date palm (Phoenix dactylifera), or a clay imitation of one or the other. The bucket was presumably either leather, metal, or basketry, and is thought to have held either holy water or pollen, or perhaps both.

== Uses ==
Although fully explanatory texts regarding these objects are exceedingly rare, from written record it does seem highly likely that they were together employed in rituals of purification, as revealed by their Akkadian (also called Assyrian, Babylonian) names: Banduddû ("bucket") and mullilu ("purifier"). In this case the fir cone would be dipped in the bucket of water before being shaken in order to sprinkle water that ritually purified a person or object.

Alternatively the close association of the objects with depictions of stylised trees has led to the suggestion that it depicts fertilisation. In this case the pollen from the male flower of the date palm would be being shaken onto the tree.
