= Winged genie =

Term for a recurring motif in Assyrian sculpture

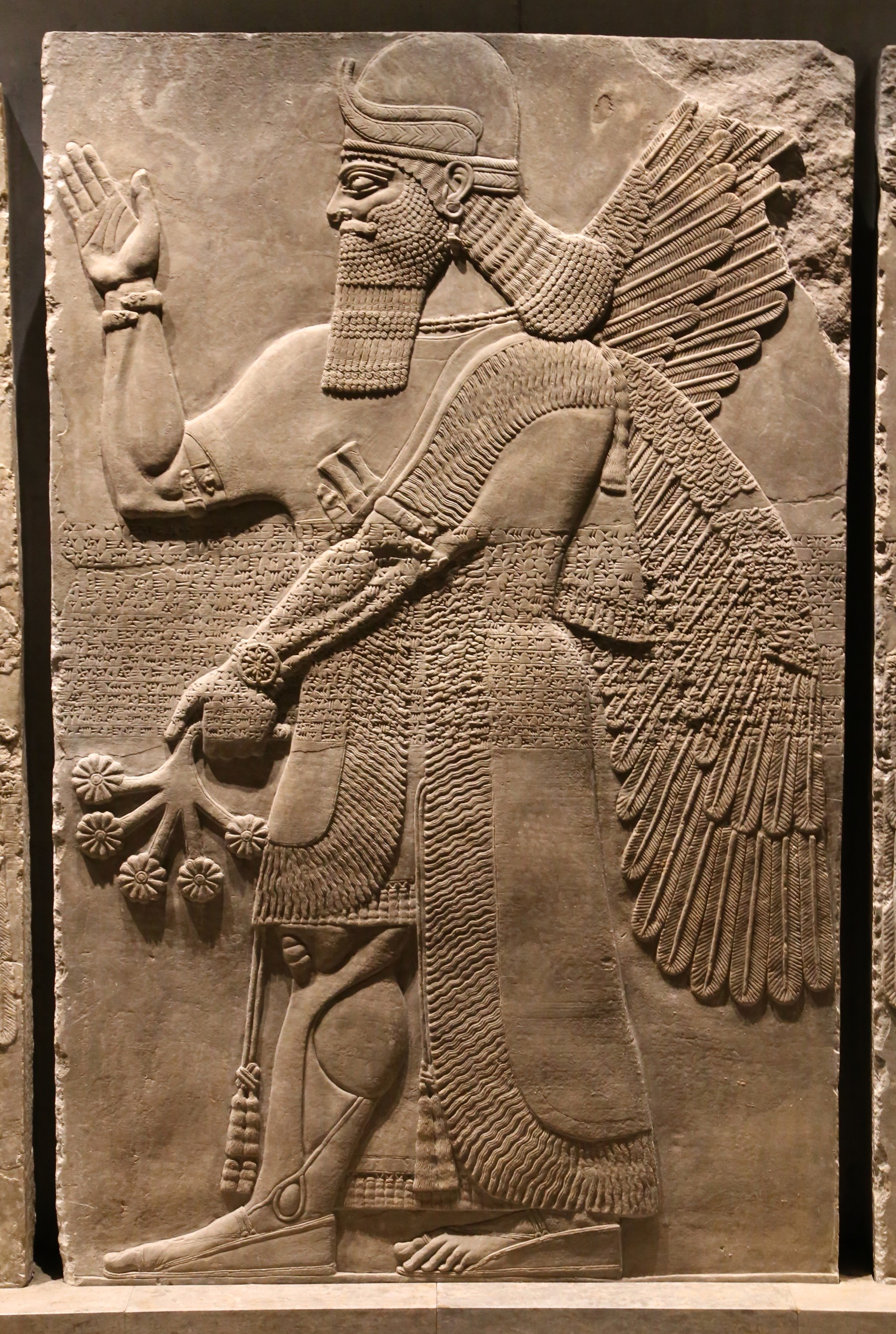
Winged genie, c. 870 BC, with inscription running across his midriff.

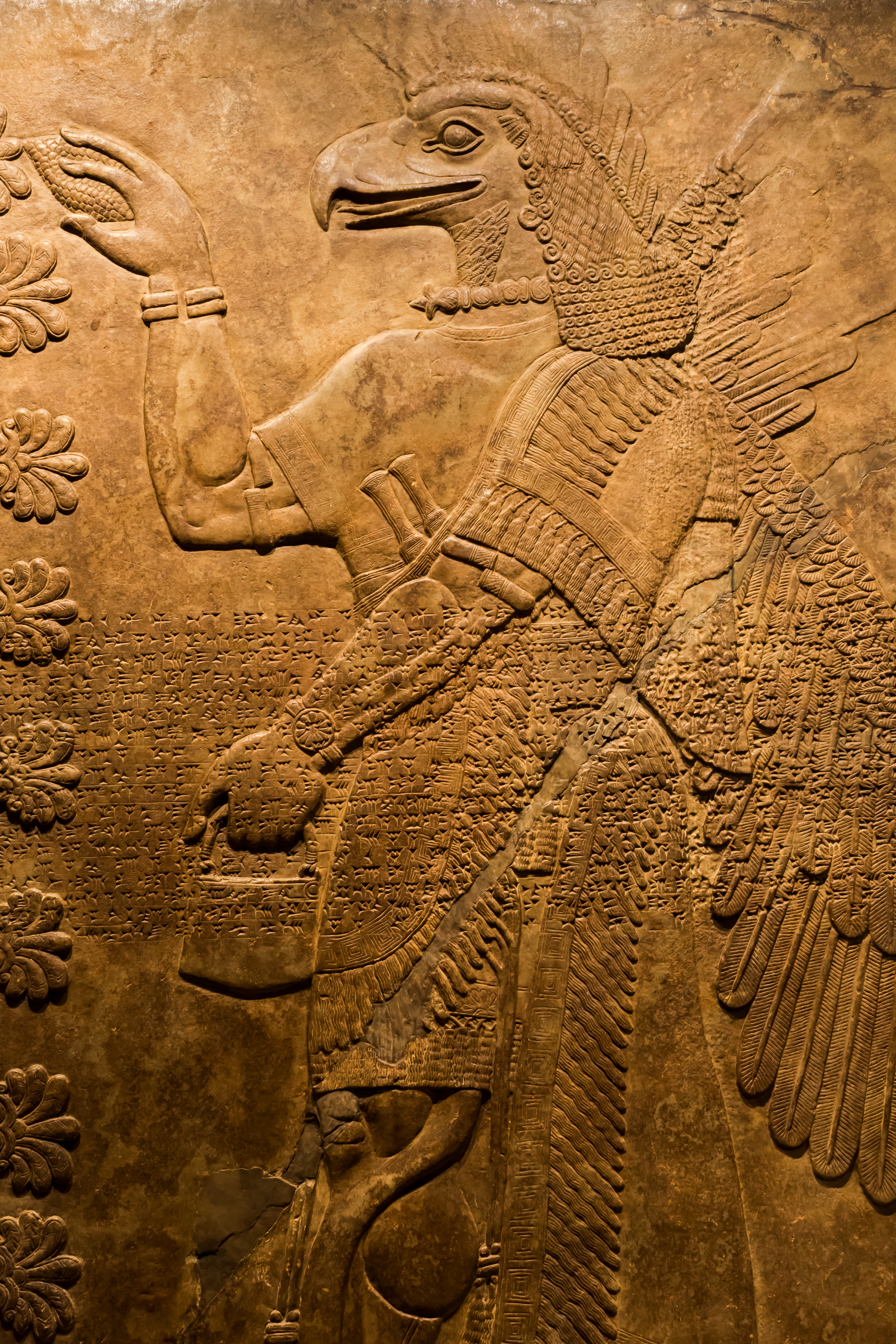
An eagle-headed protective spirit holding a bucket and cone.

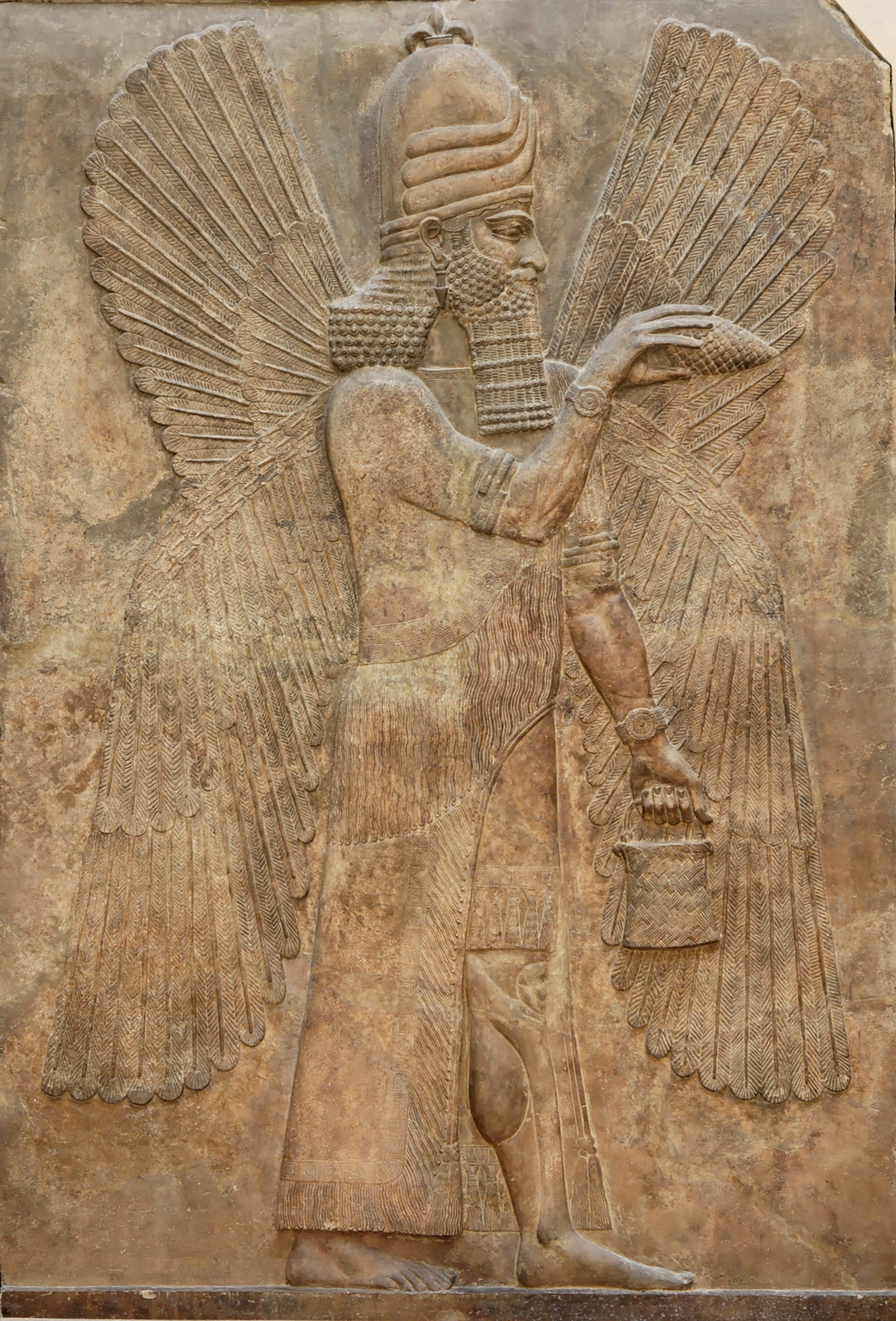
A four-winged genie in the Bucket and cone motif. Relief from the north wall of the Palace of king Sargon II at Dur Sharrukin, 713–716 BC.

Winged genie is the conventional term for a recurring motif in the iconography of Assyrian sculpture. Winged genies are usually bearded male figures sporting birds' wings. The Genii are a reappearing trait in ancient Assyrian art, and are displayed most prominently in palaces or places of royalty. The two most notable places where the genies existed were Ashurnasirpal II’s palace Kalhu, and Sargon II’s palace Dur-Sharrukin.

== Variations of style ==
They appear in the reliefs of the walls and throughout the temples and palaces in a wide variety of ways. There are three common stylistic tendencies in reliefs with genii:

- bearded, winged figures wearing a horned helmet
- bearded, winged figures wearing a diadem instead of helmet
- winged, muscular, male figures with bird heads.

They are usually adorned with rosettes on their diadem and/or wrists. Most often they are wearing a short sleeved, knee-length tunic with a tasseled hem. Over the tunic is an ankle length fringed shawl that covers the near leg, wraps around the body and drapes the left shoulder, with the end hanging down the back to the waist.

== Origin ==
These genii have all been interpreted as beings known as antediluvian sages, or apkallu in Akkadian. They were beings that existed during a godlike generation of humanity. They were closely associated with the god Enki: During the antediluvian age humanity was "covered" or more commonly referred to as the great flood, and the inhabitants were purified and roamed the earth as invisible spirits. Other references describe the apkallu as purified humans that were sent by the ruler god Marduk to Apsû, the underground sweet water realm of Enki / Ea.

== Functions ==
Aside from their wardrobe, the genii were created with several different functioning symbols. Several genii are shown carrying a small quadruped. This small creature, possibly a fawn or gazelle, had been interpreted as being a representation of a scapegoat. This creature was used to contain the spirit of an exorcised demon. The genii would hold the quadruped to show its supernatural protective powers for the king and his people. The other interpretation of this symbol lies with its association with abundance. The genii shown holding the quadruped represents the divine reasoning for the kingdom's abundance and protection over said abundance.

Other depictions of genii show them holding what appear to be a pine cone and a pail. These two elements are commonly associated with the Tree of Life. Many interpretations have stated that the depiction is of the genii fertilizing the tree and tending to it. Other interpretations place the pine cone as an object known as a mu-li-la, and in conjunction with the pail, is used to avert evil forces whether real or supernatural. Another interpretation stated that the tree and sun above it represent the distinction between heaven and earth. Some theories state that these symbols are directly related to the cult of Assur, where the sun symbolizes Shamash the sun god and the tree symbolizes Assur himself. Therefore, it is inferred that the genii protecting the tree represent the supernatural forces that the Assyrians believed were protecting the earth and more importantly the Assyrian Empire.

== Similarity to the king ==
Due to the ornate nature of the kings and genii, there are many times in which the distinction between the king and a genie are impossible. They are dressed in identical clothes and if the genie has no wings there is nothing separating it from a human. Both genii and the king would wear earrings made of a single conical-tipped pendant suspended from a crescent. Also if a genie was bearded there would be nothing different from a beard on that of a human. The standard beard of a human consisted three layers, and the genie would have the same as well. Variations of beards later on do exist, but still do not distinguish the genii from the king.

== Cross culture influence ==
Winged genii co-existed with numerous other mythological hybrids in the Early Iron Age art of Assyria and Asia Minor. They influenced Archaic Greece during its "orientalizing period", resulting in the hybrid creatures of Greek mythology such as the Chimera, the Griffin or Pegasus and, in the case of the "winged man", Talos. The orientalizing period has its origin in Early Iron Age (9th century BC) Crete, where bearded and winged figures clearly inspired by Assyrian templates are found engraved in bronze bowls and other artefacts.

The "winged man" also makes an appearance among the Chayot of Ezekiel's Merkabah vision, and via Revelation 4:7 becomes the symbol of Matthew the Evangelist. The Seraphim of Isaiah (6:1–3) have six wings each.

Winged genie from the Nimrud palace of Ashurnasirpal II, now at the Museu Calouste Gulbenkian in Lisbon.

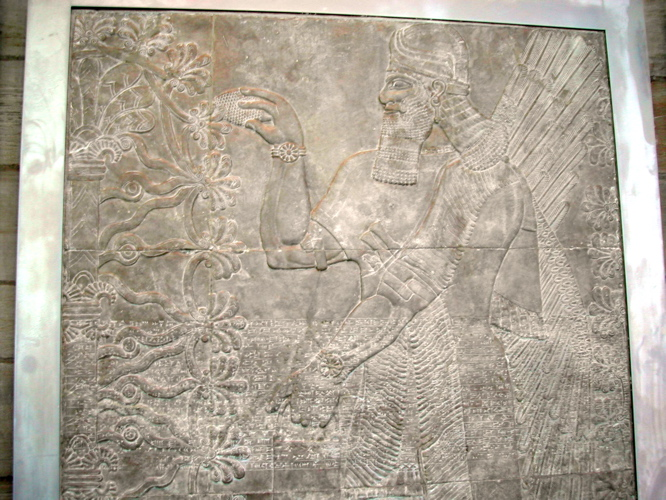
Pollinating winged genie, kept at the Yale University Art Gallery

== See also ==
- Assyrian art
- Faravahar
- Jinn
- Seraph
- Winged sun
