= Hybrid beasts in folklore =

Mythological creature combining body parts of more than one real species

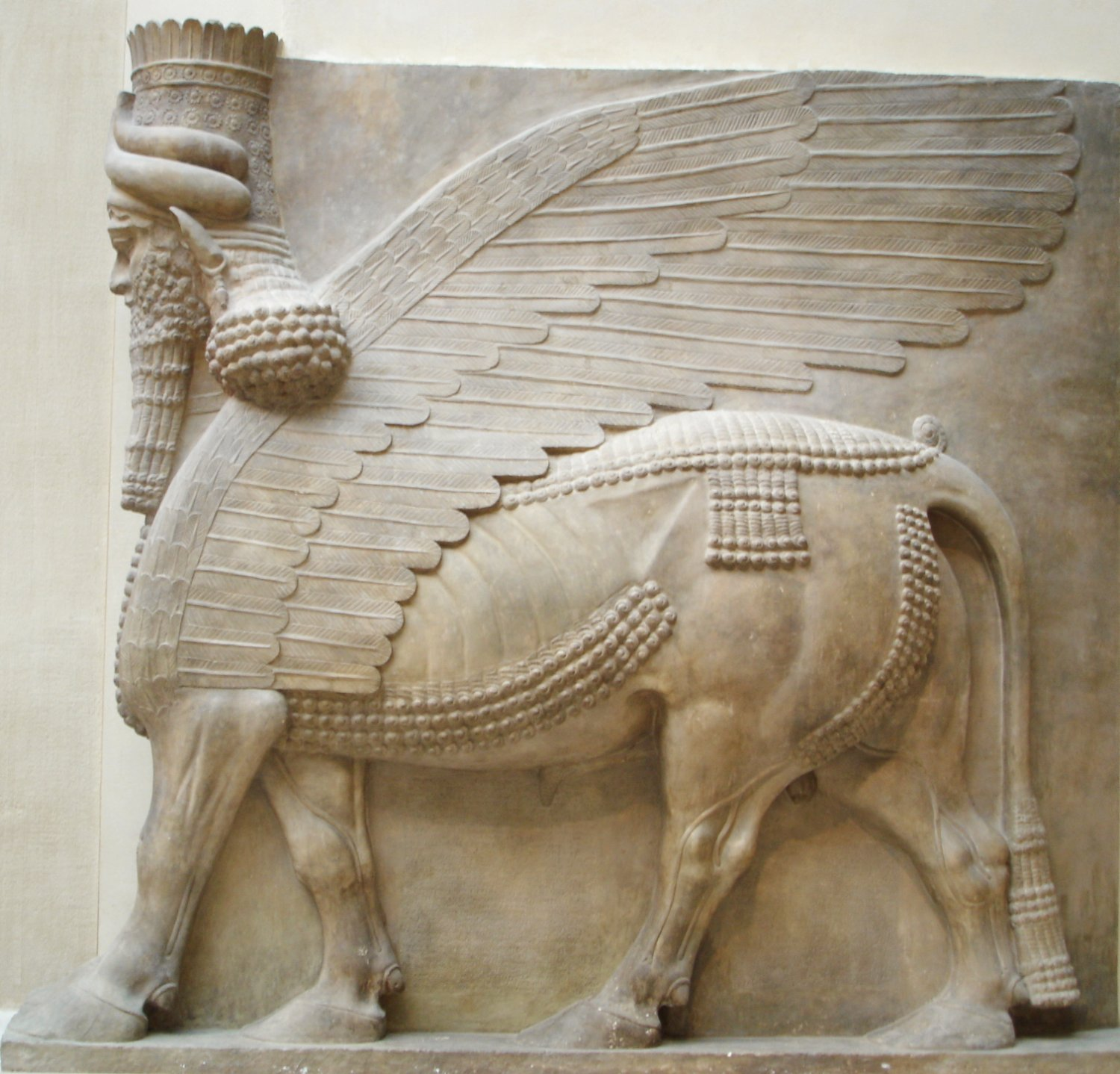
Assyrian shedu from the entrance to the throne room of the palace of Sargon II at Dur-Sharrukin (late 8th century BC), excavated by Paul-Émile Botta, 1843–1844, now at the Department of Oriental antiquities, Richelieu wing of the Louvre.

Hybrid beasts are creatures composed of parts from different animals, including humans, appearing in the folklore of a variety of cultures as legendary creatures.

== In burial sites ==
Remains similar to those of mythological hybrids have been found in burial sites discovered by archaeologists. Known combinations include horse-cows, sheep-cows, and a six-legged sheep. The skeletons were formed by ancient peoples who joined together body parts from animal carcasses of different species. The practice is believed to have been done as an offering to their gods.

== Description ==
These forms' motifs appear across cultures in many mythologies around the world.

Such hybrids can be classified as partly human hybrids (such as mermaids or centaurs) or non-human hybrids combining two or more non-human animal species (such as the griffin or the chimera). Hybrids often originate as zoomorphic deities who, over time, are given an anthropomorphic aspect.

=== Paleolithic ===
Partly human hybrids appear in petroglyphs or cave paintings from the Upper Paleolithic, in shamanistic or totemistic contexts. Ethnologist Ivar Lissner theorized that cave paintings of beings combining human and animal features were not physical representations of mythical hybrids, but were instead attempts to depict shamans in the process of acquiring the mental and spiritual attributes of various beasts or power animals. Religious historian Mircea Eliade has observed that beliefs regarding animal identity and transformation into animals are widespread. The iconography of the Vinca culture of Neolithic Europe in particular is noted for its frequent depiction of an owl-beaked "bird goddess", although this interpretation is critiqued as being derived from feminist archeology.

=== Ancient Middle East ===
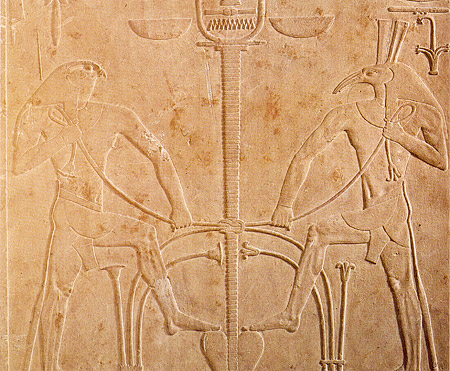
The falcon-headed Horus and crane-headed Seth.

Examples of humans with animal heads (theriocephaly) in the ancient Egyptian pantheon include jackal-headed Anubis, cobra-headed Amunet, lion-headed Sekhmet, and falcon-headed Horus. Most of these deities also have a purely zoomorphic and a purely anthropomorphic aspect, with the hybrid representation seeking to capture aspects of both of which at once. Similarly, the Gaulish Artio sculpture found in Bern, Switzerland shows a juxtaposition of a bear and a woman figure, interpreted as representations of the theriomorphic and the anthropomorphic aspect of the same goddess.

Non-human hybrids also appear in ancient Egyptian iconography, as in Ammit (combining the crocodile, lion, and hippopotamus).

Mythological hybrids became very popular in Luwian and Assyrian art of the Late Bronze Age to Early Iron Age. The angel (human with birds' wings, see winged genie) the mermaid (part human part fish, see Enki, Atargatis, and Apkallu) and the shedu all trace their origins to Assyro-Babylonian art. In Mesopotamian mythology the urmahlullu, or lion-man, served as a guardian spirit, especially of bathrooms.

The Burney Relief (part-woman/part-owl, prefigures the harpy/siren motif), is thought to be a depiction of Ereshkigal, or most likely Ishtar as Kilili.

Harpies were human sized birds with the faces of human women. They were once considered beautiful creatures but over time were then considered to be ugly and hideous. Harpies were used for torture; their most known torture was that of Phineus who was said to have offended the heavens. They would torture their victims by taking food from them and polluting what was left with their feces. They would leave just enough for their victims to stay alive.

=== Mediterranean ===
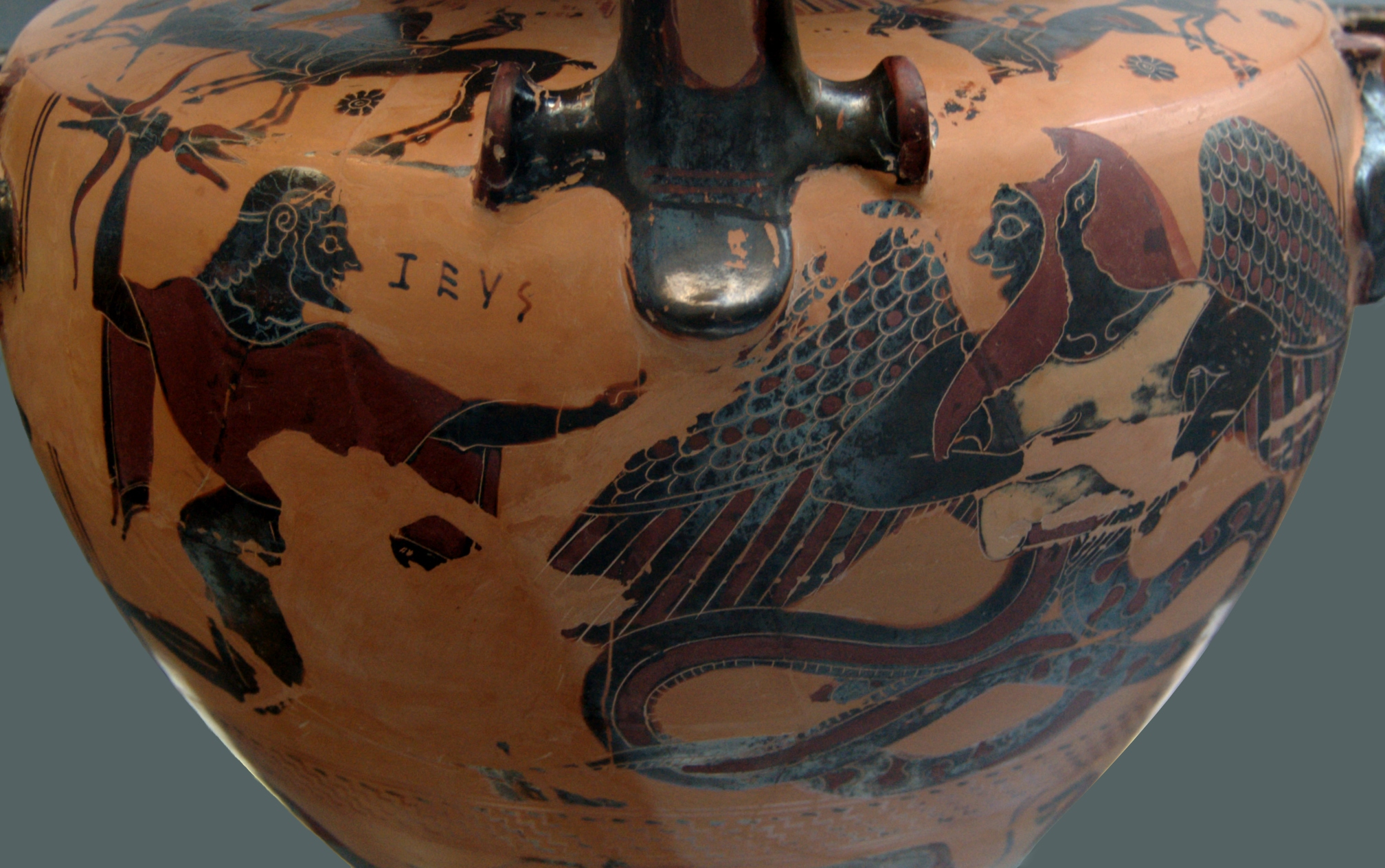
Zeus darting his lightning at Typhon, shown as a hybrid with a human torso, bird's wings and a reptilian lower body (Chalcidian black-figured hydria, c. c. 550 BC, Staatliche Antikensammlungen Inv. 596).

In Archaic Greece, Luwian and Assyrian motifs were imitated, during the Orientalizing period (9th–8th centuries BC), inspiring the monsters of the mythology of the Classical Greek period, such as the chimera, harpy, centaur, griffin, hippocampus, Talos, and Pegasus.

The motif of the winged man appears in the Assyrian winged genie, and is taken up in the Biblical seraphim and Chayot, Etruscan Vanth, Hellenistic Eros-Cupid, and ultimately the Christian iconography of angels.

The motif of otherwise human figures sporting horns may derive from partly goat hybrids (as in Pan in Greek mythology and the Devil in Christian iconography) or as partly bull hybrids (Minotaur). The Gundestrup cauldron and the Pashupati figure have stag's antlers (see also Horned God, horned helmet). The Christian representation of Moses with horns, however, is due to a mistranslation of the Hebrew text of Exodus 34:29–35 by Jerome.

=== South Asia ===
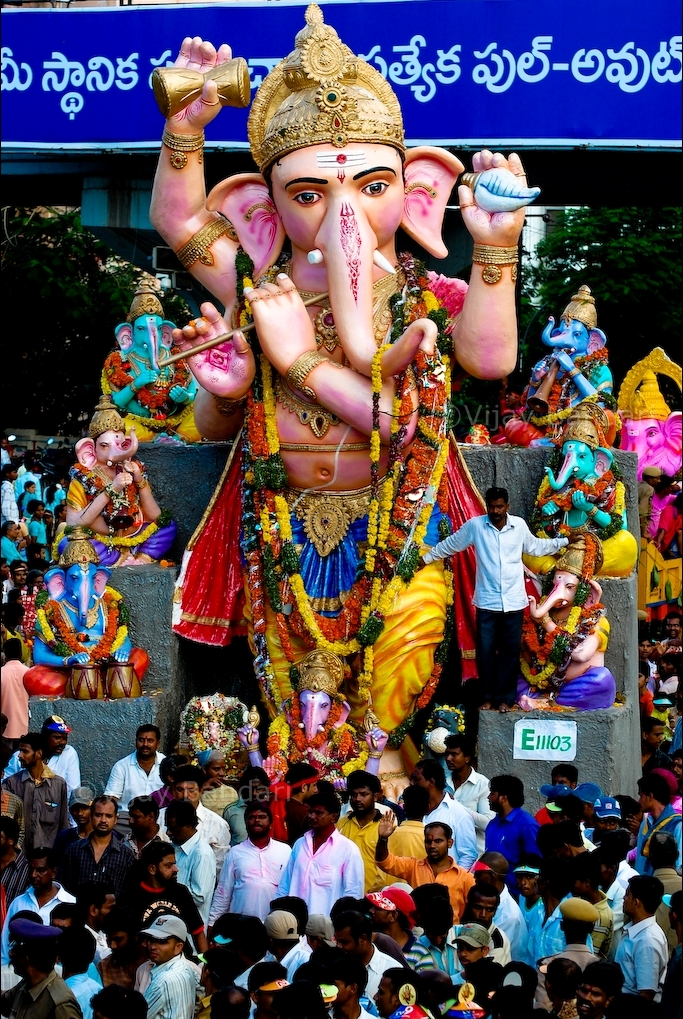
Street festivities in Hyderabad, India, during the festival of Ganesh Chaturthi.

The most prominent hybrid in Hindu iconography is elephant-headed Ganesha, god of wisdom, knowledge and new beginnings.

Both Nāga and Garuda are non-hybrid mythical animals (snake and bird, respectively) in their early attestations, but become partly human hybrids in later iconography.

The god Vishnu is believed to have taken his first four incarnations in human-animal form, namely: Matsya (human form with fish's body below waist), Kurma (human form with turtle's body below waist), Varaha (human form with a boar's head), and Narasimha (human form with lion's head).

Kamadhenu, the mythical cow which is considered to be the mother of all other cattle, is often portrayed as a cow with human head, peacock tail and bird wings.

== See also ==
- Animal worship
- Bestiary
- Human-animal hybrid
- Hybrid
- Liminal being
- Monster
- Power animal
- Shapeshifting
- Theriocephaly
