= Bird goddess =

Type of artifact from the European Neolithic Vinca culture

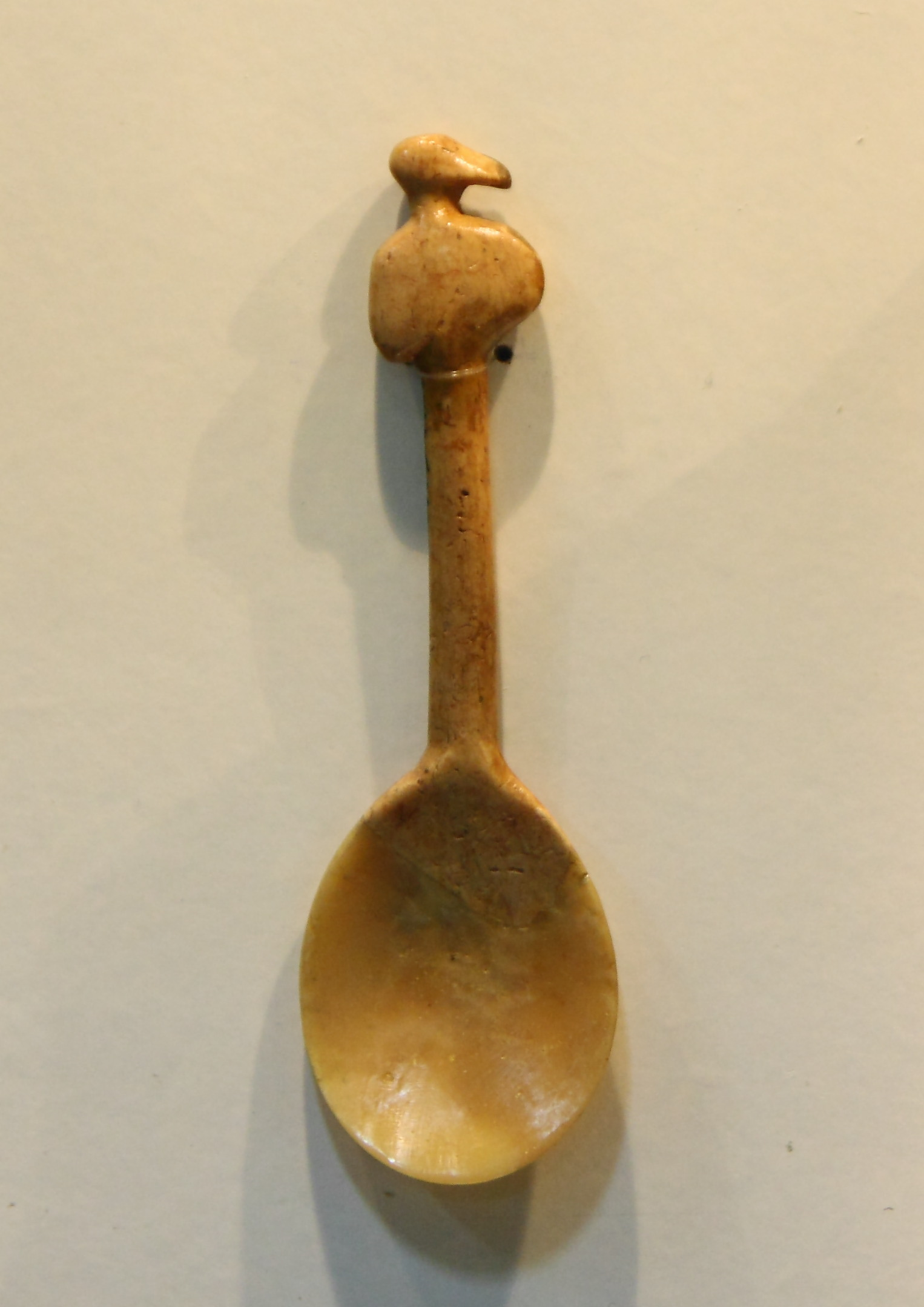
Neolithic bird representation

The term bird goddess was coined by Marija Gimbutas with relation to figurines attributed to the Neolithic Vinca culture. These figurines show female bodies combined with a bird's head. The interpretation as "goddess" is part of Gimbutas' program of feminist archaeology depicting the European Neolithic as a "gynocentric" culture that would be ousted by the "patriarchal" Indo-European cultures with the onset of the Bronze Age.

Griffen (2005) claims to have discovered a sign for the bird goddess in the Vinča signs.

== See also ==
- Augur
- Leda (mythology)
- Language of the birds

== Literature ==
- Gimbutas, Marija and Campbell, Joseph, The Language of the Goddess, Thames & Hudson (2001) ISBN 0-500-28249-8
