= La Tène culture =

Iron Age culture of Europe

- Geographical range: Western/Central Europe
- Period: Iron Age
- Dates: c. 450 BC – c. 1 BC
- Type site: La Tène, Neuchâtel
- Preceded by: Hallstatt culture
- Followed by: Roman Republic, Roman Empire, Roman Gaul, Roman Britain, Hispania, Germania, Rhaetia, Noricum, Roman Iron Age

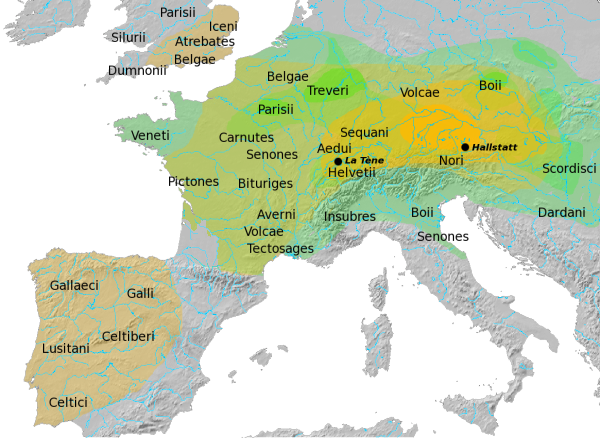
Overview of the Hallstatt and La Tène cultures. The core Hallstatt territory (800 BC) is shown in solid yellow, the area of influence by 500 BC in light yellow. The core territory of the La Tène culture (450 BC) is shown in solid green, the area of La Tène influence by 50 BC in light green. The territories of some major Celtic tribes are labelled. Map drawn after Atlas of the Celtic World, by John Haywood (2001: 30–37).

The La Tène culture (/ləˈtɛn/; French pronunciation: [la tɛn]) was a European Iron Age culture. It developed and flourished during the late Iron Age (from about 450 BC to the Roman conquest in the 1st century BC), succeeding the early Iron Age Hallstatt culture without any definite cultural break, under considerable Mediterranean influence from the Greeks in pre-Roman Gaul, the Etruscans, and the Golasecca culture, but whose artistic style nevertheless did not depend on those Mediterranean influences.

La Tène culture's territorial extent corresponded to what is now France, Belgium, Switzerland, Austria, England, Southern Germany, the Czech Republic, Northern Italy and Central Italy, Slovenia, Hungary and Liechtenstein, as well as adjacent parts of the Netherlands, Slovakia, Serbia, Croatia, Transylvania (western Romania), and Transcarpathia (western Ukraine). The Celtiberians of western Iberia shared many aspects of the culture, though not generally the artistic style. To the north extended the contemporary Pre-Roman Iron Age of Northern Europe, including the Jastorf culture of Northern Germany and Denmark and all the way to Galatia in Asia Minor (today Turkey).

Centered on ancient Gaul, the culture became very widespread, and encompasses a wide variety of local differences. It is often distinguished from earlier and neighbouring cultures mainly by the La Tène style of Celtic art, characterized by curving "swirly" decoration, especially of metalwork.

It is named after the type site of La Tène on the north side of Lake Neuchâtel in Switzerland, where thousands of objects had been deposited in the lake, as was discovered after the water level dropped in 1857 (due to the Jura water correction).

In the popular understanding, La Tène describes the culture and art of the ancient Celts, a term that is firmly entrenched in the popular understanding, but it is considered controversial by modern scholarship.

== Periodization ==
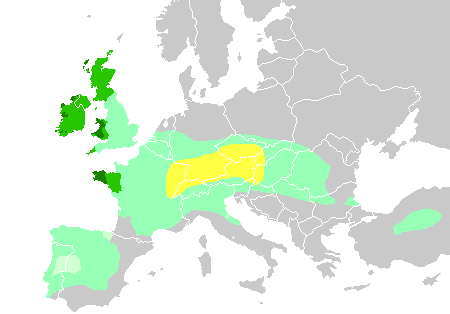
Celtic expansion in Europe and Anatolia: Core Hallstatt territory, 8th–6th century BC Maximal Celtic expansion by 275 BC Uncertain or disputed Celtic presence in Iberia (Lusitanians and Vettones) Celtic nations with significant numbers of Celtic speakers in the Early Modern period Areas where Celtic languages remain widely spoken today

Extensive contacts through trade are recognized in foreign objects deposited in elite burials; stylistic influences on La Tène material culture can be recognized in Etruscan, Italic, Greek, Dacian and Scythian sources. Datable Greek pottery and analysis employing scientific techniques such as dendrochronology and thermoluminescence help provide date ranges for an absolute chronology at some La Tène sites.

La Tène history was originally divided into "early", "middle" and "late" stages based on the typology of the metal finds (Otto Tischler 1885), with the Roman occupation greatly disrupting the culture, although many elements remain in Gallo-Roman and Romano-British culture. A broad cultural unity was not paralleled by overarching social-political unifying structures, and the extent to which the material culture can be linguistically linked is debated. The art history of La Tène culture has various schemes of periodization.

The archaeological period is now mostly divided into four sub-periods, following Paul Reinecke.

Tischler (1885)	Reinecke (1902)	Date
La Tène I	La Tène A	450–380 BC
La Tène I	La Tène B	380–250 BC
La Tène II	La Tène C	250–150 BC
La Tène III	La Tène D	150–1 BC

== History ==
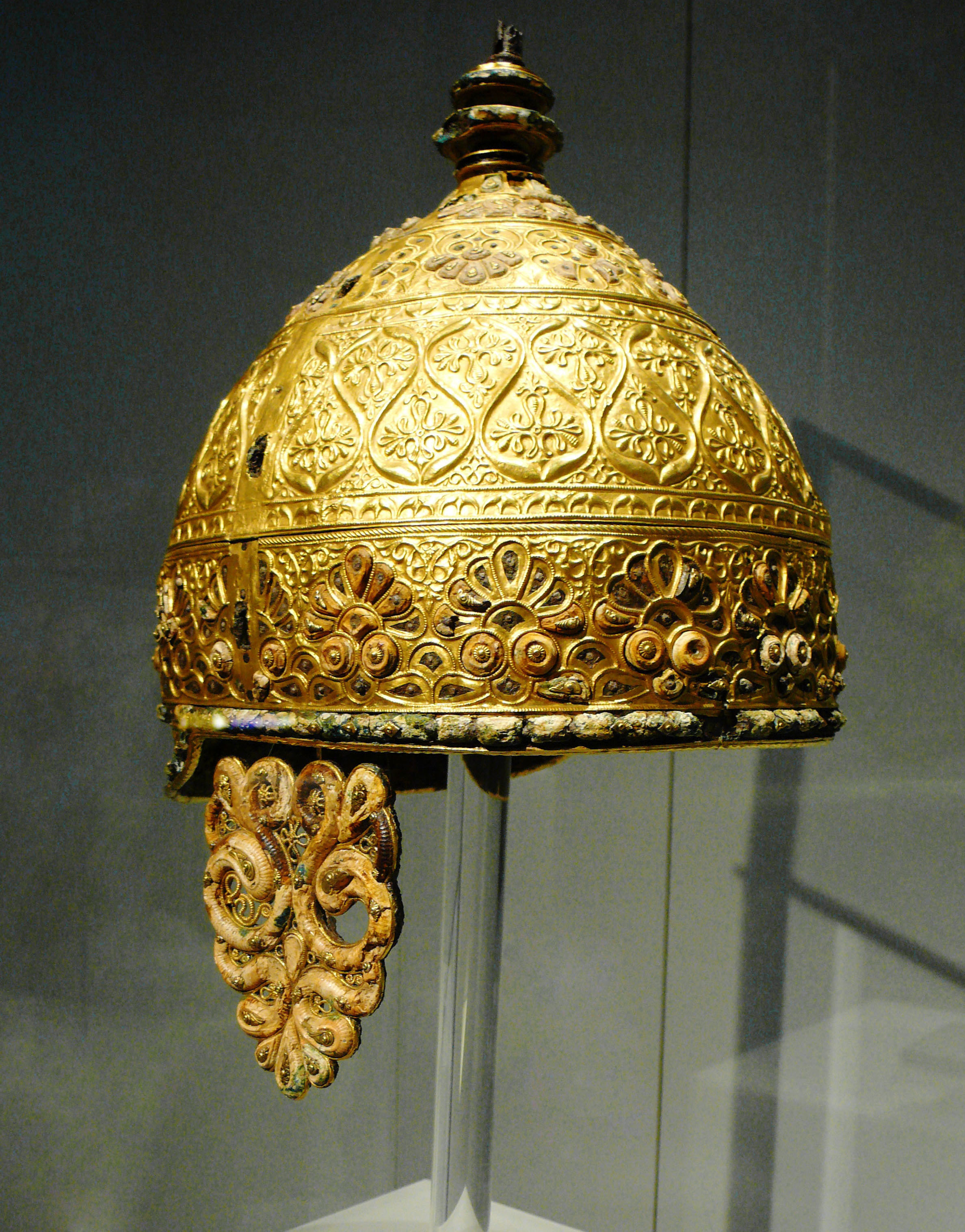
Agris Helmet, France, c. 350 BC

The preceding final phase of the Hallstatt culture, HaD, c. 650–450 BC, was also widespread across Central Europe, and the transition over this area was gradual, being mainly detected through La Tène style elite artefacts, which first appear on the western edge of the old Hallstatt region.

Though there is no agreement on the precise region in which La Tène culture first developed, there is a broad consensus that the centre of the culture lay on the northwest edges of Hallstatt culture, north of the Alps, within the region between in the West the valleys of the Marne and Moselle, and the part of the Rhineland nearby. In the east the western end of the old Hallstatt core area in modern Bavaria, the Czech Republic, Austria and Switzerland formed a somewhat separate "eastern style Province" in the early La Tène, joining with the western area in Alsace. In 1994 a prototypical ensemble of elite grave sites of the early 5th century BC was excavated at Glauberg in Hesse, northeast of Frankfurt-am-Main, in a region that had formerly been considered peripheral to the La Tène sphere. The site at La Tène itself was therefore near the southern edge of the original "core" area (as is also the case for the Hallstatt site for its core).

The establishment of a Greek colony, soon very successful, at Massalia (modern Marseilles) on the Mediterranean coast of France led to great trade with the Hallstatt areas up the Rhône and Saône river systems, and early La Tène elite burials like the Vix Grave in Burgundy contain imported luxury goods along with artifacts produced locally. Most areas were probably controlled by tribal chiefs living in hilltop forts, while the bulk of the population lived in small villages or farmsteads in the countryside.

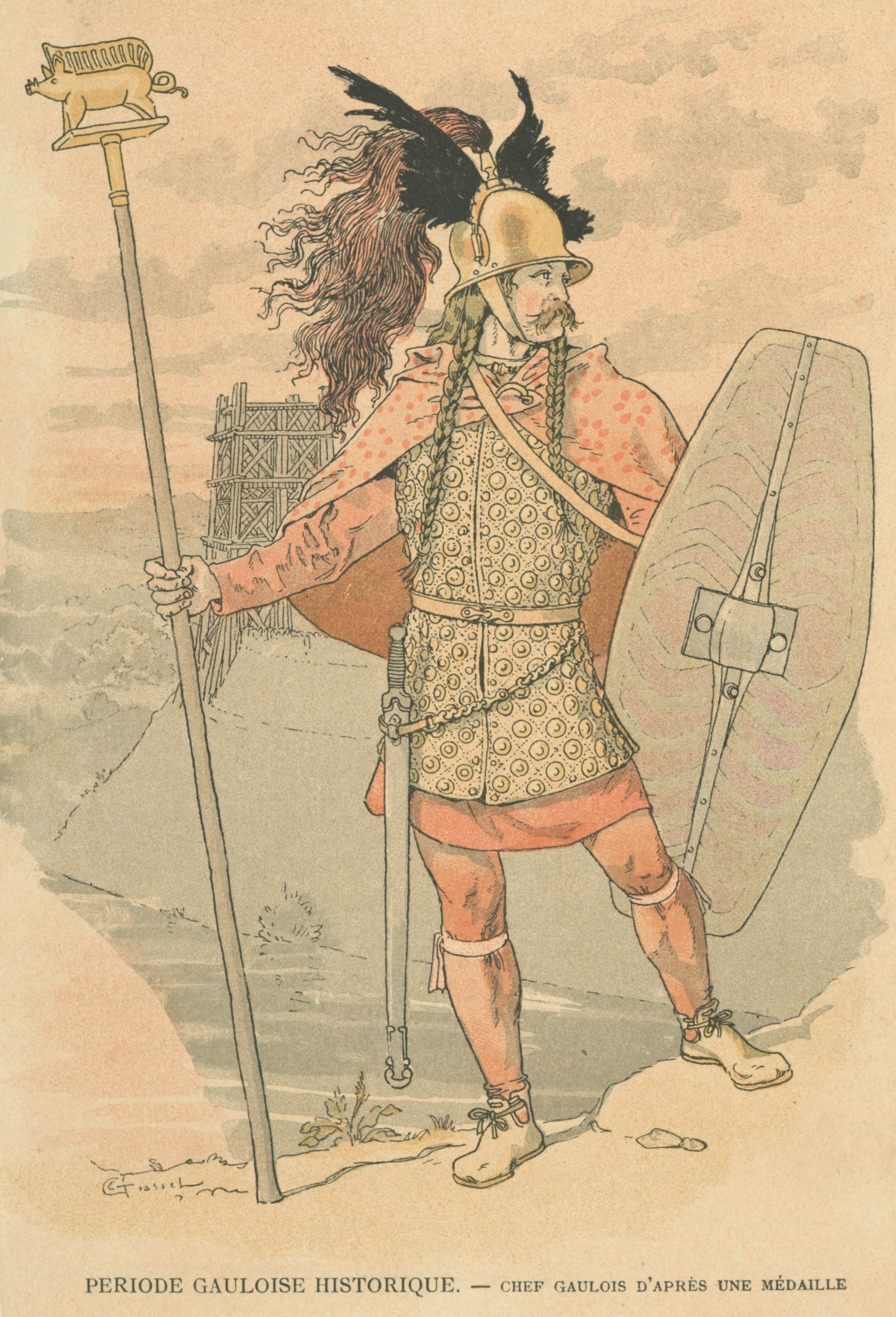
1910 illustration of a Gallic chief

By 500 BC the Etruscans expanded to border Celts in north Italy, and trade across the Alps began to overhaul trade with the Greeks, and the Rhône route declined. Booming areas included the middle Rhine, with large iron ore deposits, the Marne and Champagne regions, and also Bohemia, although here trade with the Mediterranean area was much less important. Trading connections and wealth no doubt played a part in the origin of the La Tène style, though how large a part remains much discussed; specific Mediterranean-derived motifs are evident, but the new style does not depend on them.

Barry Cunliffe notes localization of La Tène culture during the 5th century BC when there arose "two zones of power and innovation: a Marne – Moselle zone in the west with trading links to the Po Valley via the central Alpine passes and the Golasecca culture, and a Bohemian zone in the east with separate links to the Adriatic via the eastern Alpine routes and the Venetic culture".

From their homeland, La Tène culture expanded in the 4th century BC to more of modern France, Germany, and Central Europe, and beyond to Hispania, northern and central Italy, the Balkans, and even as far as Asia Minor, in the course of several major migrations. La Tène style artefacts start to appear in Britain around the same time, and Ireland rather later. The style of "Insular La Tène" art is somewhat different and the artefacts are initially found in some parts of the islands but not others. Migratory movements seem at best only partly responsible for the diffusion of La Tène culture there, and perhaps other parts of Europe.

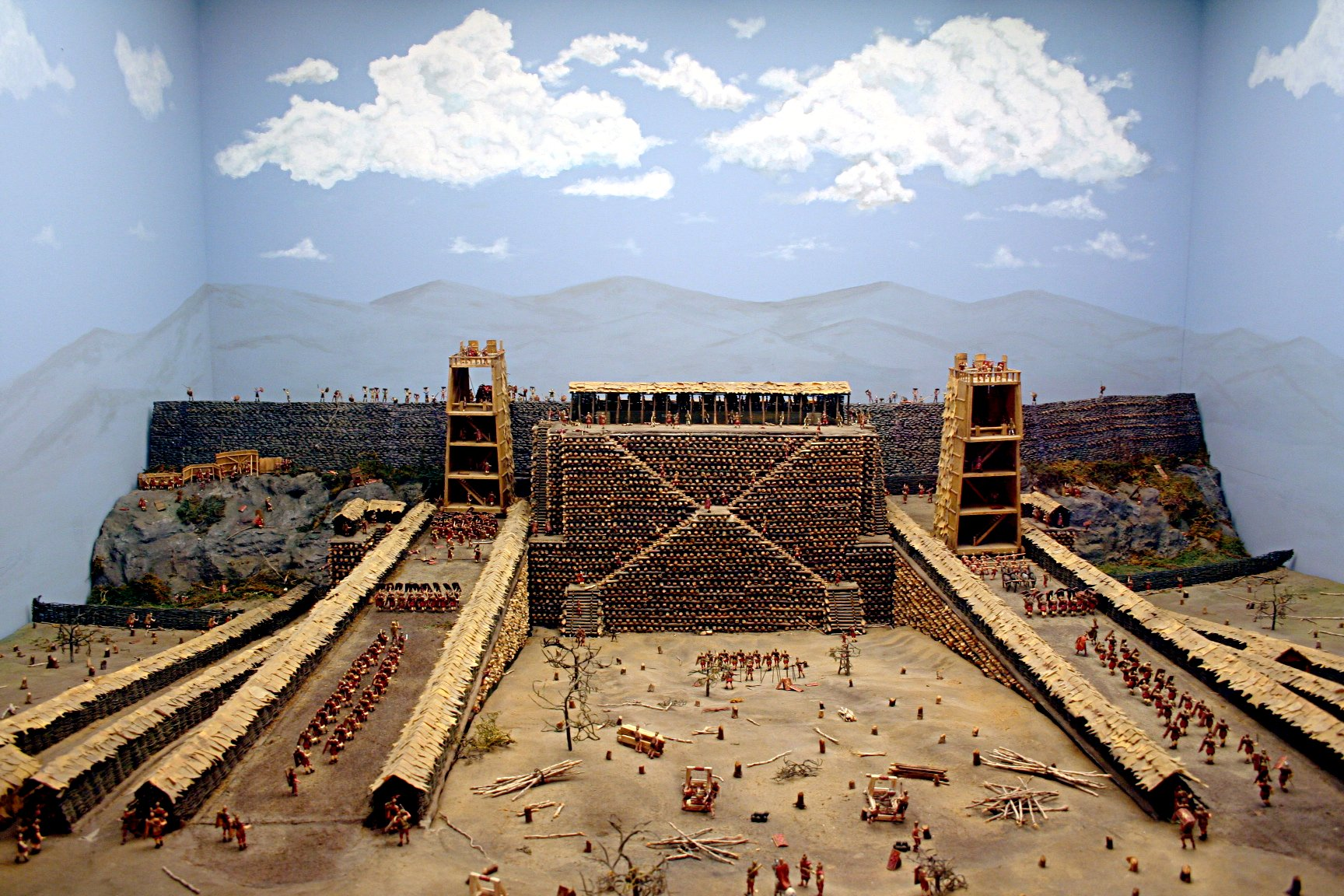
Model of the Roman siege of Avaricum, France, during the Gallic War (52 BC)

By about 400 BC, the evidence for Mediterranean trade becomes sparse; this may be because the expanding Celtic populations began to migrate south and west, coming into violent conflict with the established populations, including the Etruscans and Romans. The settled life in much of the La Tène homelands also seems to have become much more unstable and prone to wars. In about 387 BC, the Celts under Brennus defeated the Romans and then sacked Rome, establishing themselves as the most prominent threats to the Roman homeland, a status they would retain through a series of Roman-Gallic wars until Julius Caesar's final conquest of Gaul in 58–50 BC. The Romans prevented the Celts from reaching very far south of Rome, but on the other side of the Adriatic Sea groups passed through the Balkans to reach Greece, where Delphi was attacked and sacked in 279 BC, and Asia, where Galatia was established as a Celtic area of Anatolia. By this time, the La Tène style was spreading to the British Isles, though apparently without any significant movements in population.

After about 275 BC, Roman expansion into the La Tène area began with the conquest of Gallia Cisalpina. The conquest of Gallia Celtica followed in 121 BC and was complete with the Gallic Wars of the 50s BC. Gaulish culture quickly assimilated to Roman culture, giving rise to the hybrid Gallo-Roman culture of Roman Gaul. Julius Caesar's account of the Gallic Wars describes various battles, Roman sieges of Gallic cities, politics, diplomacy and alliances, and provides insights into Gallic society at that time.

== Ethnology ==
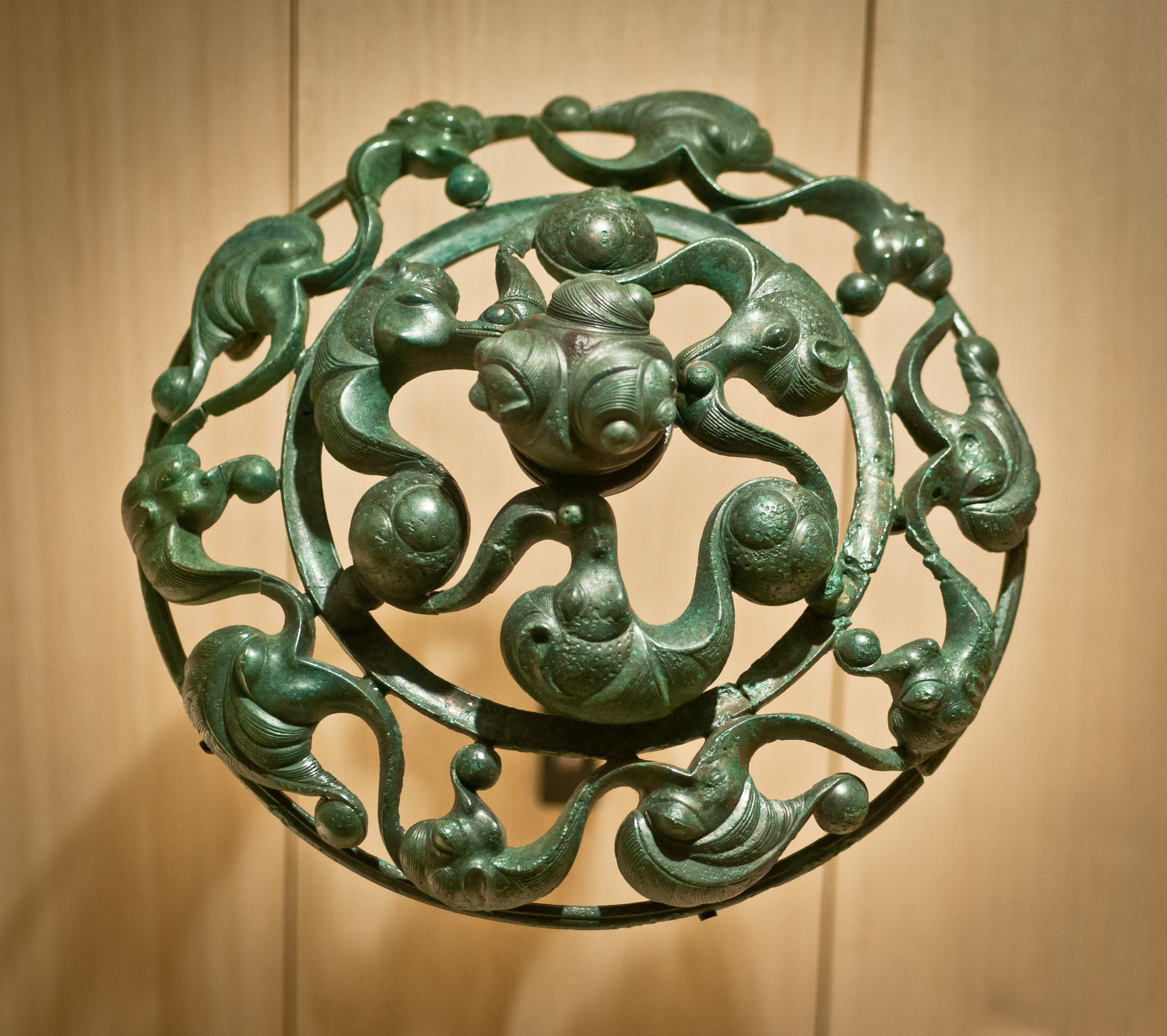
Bronze chariot fitting from Roissy, France, 3rd century BC

The bearers of the La Tène culture were the people known as Celts or Gauls to ancient ethnographers. Ancient Celtic culture had no written literature of its own, but rare examples of epigraphy in the Greek or Latin alphabets exist allowing the fragmentary reconstruction of Continental Celtic.

Current knowledge of this cultural area is derived from three sources comprising archaeological evidence, Greek and Latin literary records, and ethnographical evidence suggesting some La Tène artistic and cultural survivals in traditionally Celtic regions of far western Europe. Some of the societies that are archaeologically identified with La Tène material culture were identified by Greek and Roman authors from the 5th century onwards as Keltoi ("Celts") and Galli ("Gauls"). Herodotus (iv.49) correctly placed Keltoi at the source of the Ister/Danube, in the heartland of La Tène material culture: "The Ister flows right across Europe, rising in the country of the Celts".

Whether the usage of classical sources means that the whole of La Tène culture can be attributed to a unified Celtic people is difficult to assess; archaeologists have repeatedly concluded that language, material culture, and political affiliation do not necessarily run parallel. Frey (2004) notes that in the 5th century, "burial customs in the Celtic world were not uniform; rather, localised groups had their own beliefs, which, in consequence, also gave rise to distinct artistic expressions".

The archaeologist Miranda Aldhouse-Green describes the material culture of the La Tène period as "the floruit of Celtic civilisation". Ancient literary sources, archaeological evidence and (to a lesser extent) language, all combine to present "a picture of a Celtic world which, in its heyday (the later first millennium BC), stretched from Ireland and Spain in the west and Scotland in the north to Czechoslovakia in the east and northern Italy in the south, and even beyond Europe to Asia Minor."

Artefacts typical of the La Tène culture have been discovered in stray finds as far afield as Scandinavia, Northern Germany, Poland and in the Balkans. It is therefore common to also talk of the "La Tène period" in the context of those regions even though they were never part of the La Tène culture proper, but connected to its core area via trade.

== Culture ==
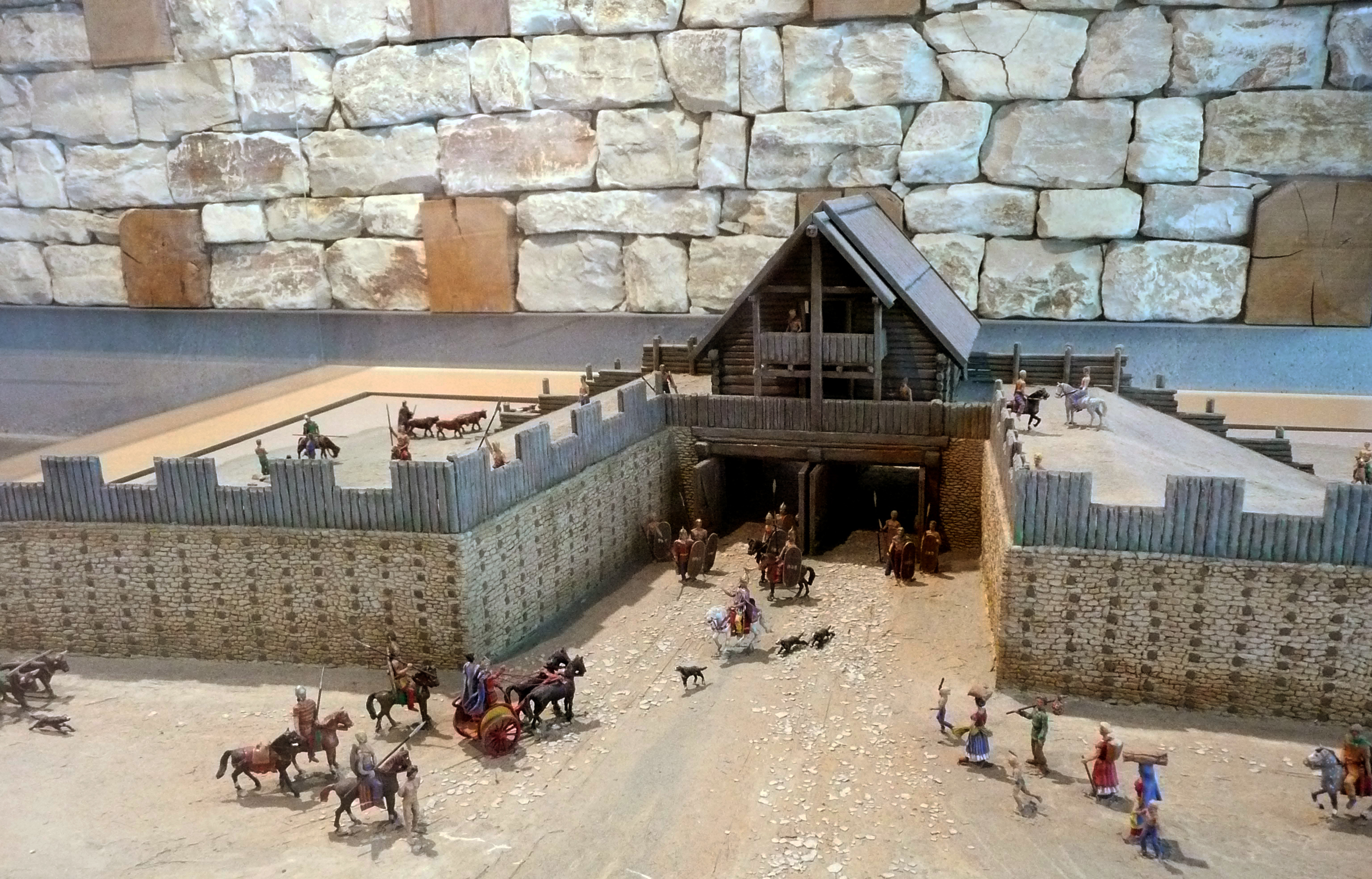
Model of the main gate at the Manching oppidum, Germany, 3rd century BC

In the final phases of the Iron Age, before the expansion of the Roman empire northwards in the first century BC, major changes are apparent in the economy and society of temperate Europe from central France to the Black Sea. The settlement pattern was transformed by the growth of large sites which functioned as towns, and new centres of industrial production distributed standardized wares over larger distances. At the same time, political power was becoming increasingly centralized … Coinage was introduced… The use of writing was known, at least for keeping official records. Thus even before the Roman conquest, large parts of Europe were occupied by literate societies with a high degree of social, economic and political development.

=== Settlements ===
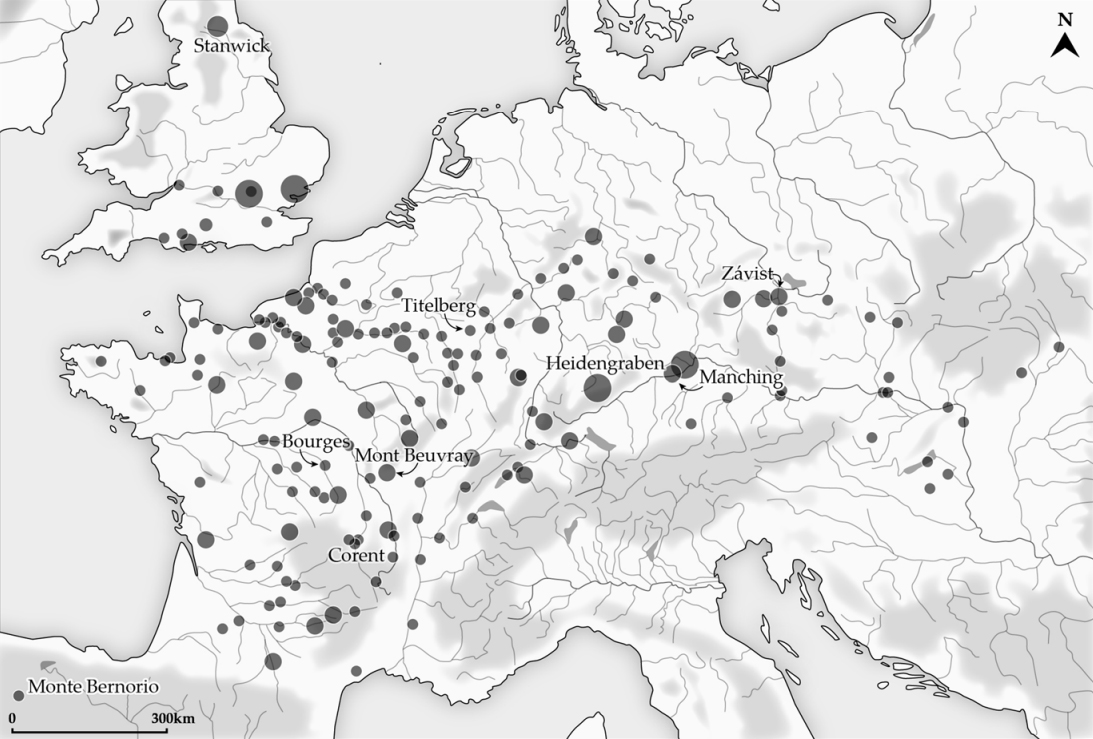
Distribution of fortified oppida, 2nd-1st century BC

Initially La Tène people lived in open settlements that were dominated by the chieftains' hill forts. The development of walled towns and cities—known as oppida—appears during the mid-La Tène culture in the 2nd century BC. The name of oppida (singular oppidum) was given by Julius Caesar to the Celtic towns and cities that he encountered during the conquest of Gaul, some of which he explicitly described as urbs (cities). Oppida were characterized by very large surface areas (up to hundreds of hectares) and were defended by often massive ramparts and walls. They are often described as 'the first cities north of the Alps', though this description has also been applied to earlier settlements of the Hallstatt and Urnfield periods. Oppida served as centres of craft production and commerce and were also important political and religious centres, with major oppida functioning as the capitals of Celtic states.

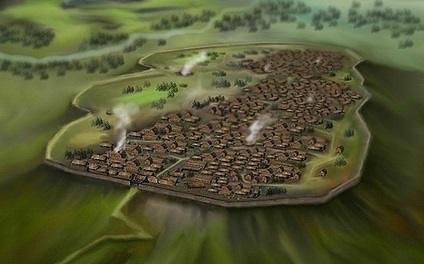
Illustration of a walled Oppidum.

Oppida appeared more or less simultaneously from the Atlantic to central Europe in the second century BC. More than 180 oppida are known today, stretching from France in the west to Hungary in the east, including oppida in Germany, Switzerland, Belgium, Luxembourg, Austria, the Czech Republic and Slovakia. Oppida-like settlements are also known from Britain and northern Spain.

Many oppida had planned layouts and some had standardised building designs, indicating a high level of central organization. At the oppidum of Manching in Germany all the buildings were constructed with the same standardised measurements, and a metal measuring rod conforming to this standard was found within the settlement. Similar standards have been identified at multiple other oppida. The layout and structure of oppidum buildings demonstrates a knowledge of geometric principles that suggests the role of specialized craftsmen, surveyors or master builders in their construction. Large buildings inside the oppida included temples, assembly spaces and other public buildings. At the oppidum of Bibracte a monumental stone basin was constructed in the centre of the oppidum based on a precise geometric design with an astronomical alignment.

La Tène buildings were typically built of wood, though stone was used in massive quantities for the construction of oppida walls, known as Murus Gallicus. Some oppida walls were several kilometres long. The construction and effectiveness of these walls was described by Julius Caesar in his account of the Gallic Wars.

Major oppida were connected by a network of roads. Wooden bridges and causeways are also known from archaeological remains and historical accounts.

A significant number of oppida developed into Roman cities following the expansion of the Roman empire. These include Vesontio (Besançon), Durocororum (Reims), Lutetia (Paris) and Avaricum (Bourges) among others.

=== Social organisation ===
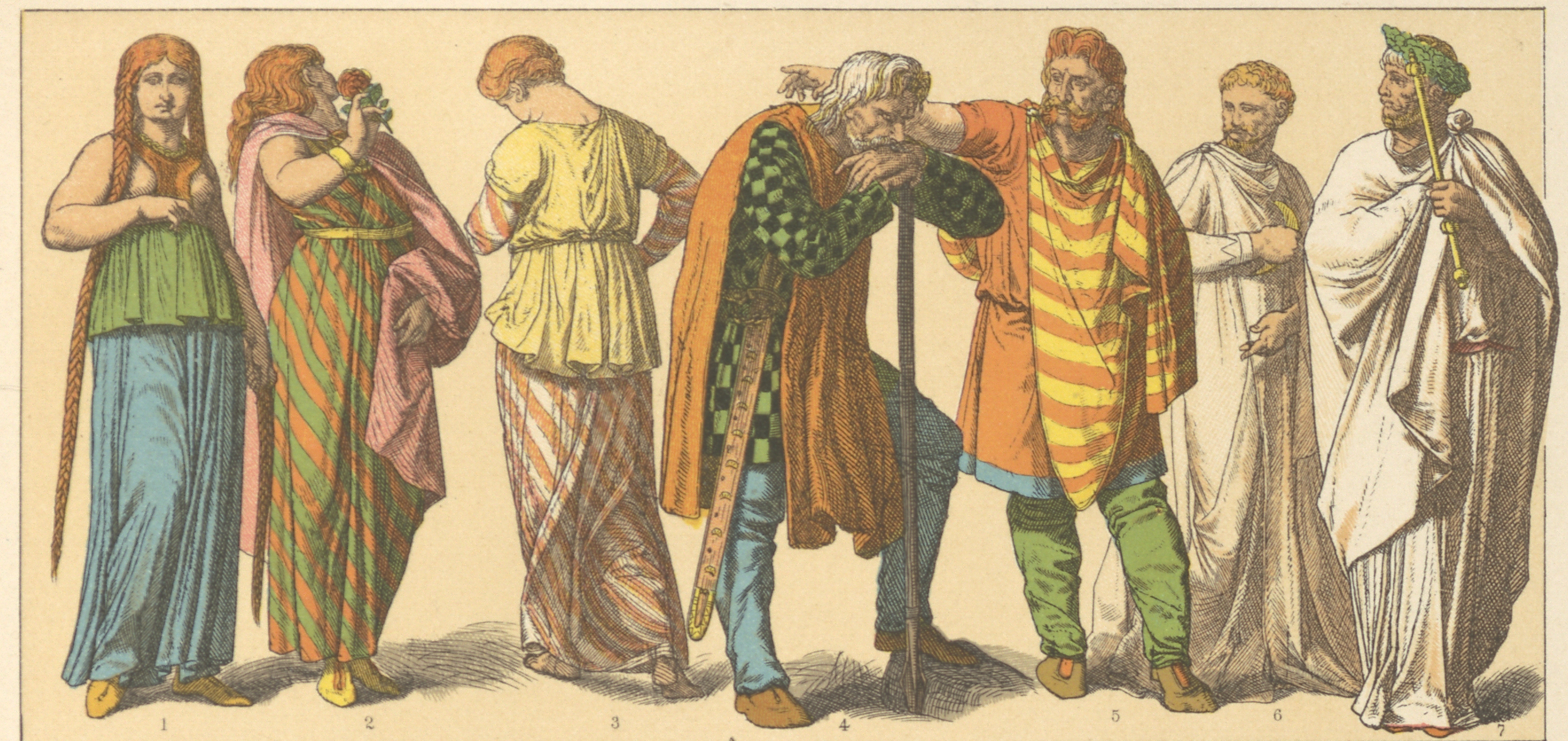
1884 illustration of Celtic people, with Druids depicted on the right

Celtic society in the La Tène period was hierarchically structured with different classes including nobles, a priestly class known as Druids, merchants, artisans and craftsmen, and farmers. Status within society was partly based on birth and partly on individual achievement. Celtic peoples were divided into tribes usually ruled by kings, with some tribes having dominion over other tribes or patron-client relations with them. Sacral kingship, in which the roles of ruler and priest are combined, may have existed in some cases. War leaders could also be appointed to command alliances of tribes in the face of a common enemy, such as Vercingetorix during the war against Rome, who was chosen as supreme leader by an assembly of Gauls who gathered at Bibracte from all over the country. Women were able to attain the highest ranks in Celtic society (including rulership as queens, particularly in Britain) and some of the richest graves in central Europe are those of women. Slavery and the trade in slaves also existed within Celtic society at this time.

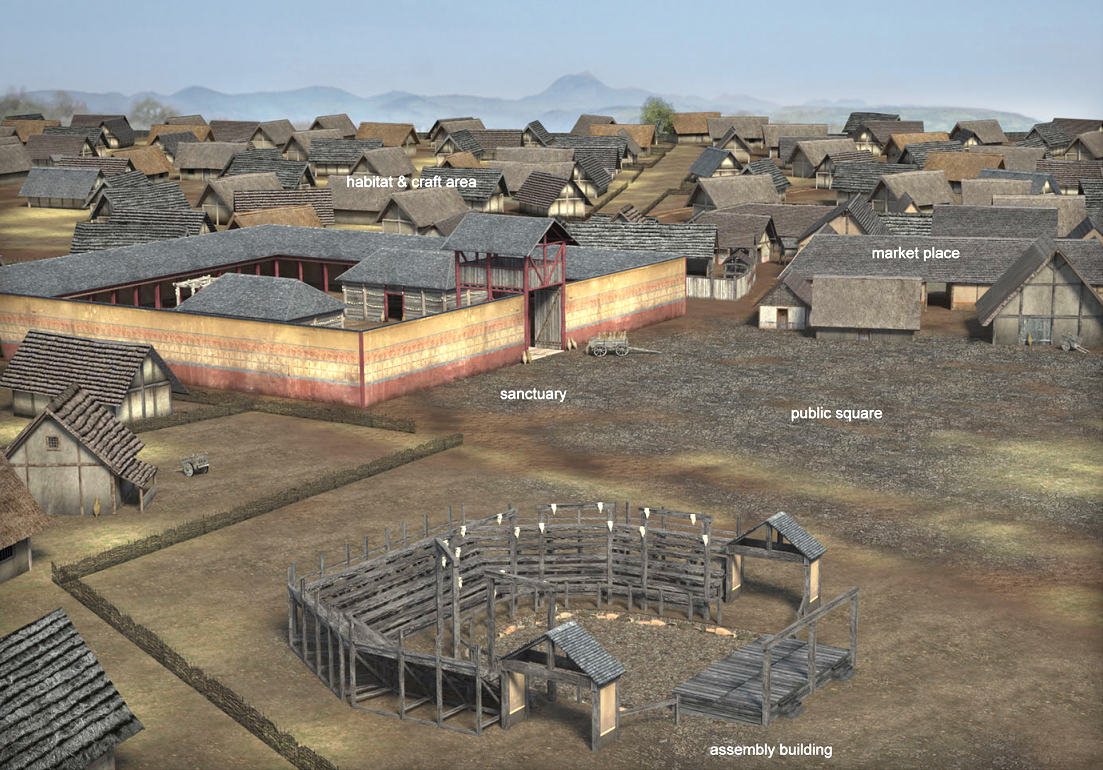
Reconstruction of the Corent oppidum in central France

In his account of the Gallic War, Julius Caesar refers to Celtic societies as civitates or states with three main classes: knights, Druids and commoners. Caesar further describes Celtic societies as being divided into 'parties', headed by individuals with authority recognised by and derived from the people that they led and represented.

By the time of Caesar's account of Celtic society (c. 50 BC), government by elected magistrates (known as Vergobrets) had replaced kingship among certain tribes, similar to the consuls and senate of Rome. Caesar refers to Vergobrets with the Latin terms princeps, civitatis, principatus, and magistratus. He also refers to ruling councils or governments of various Gaulish states as 'senates' and their members as 'senators', such as Diviciacus of the Aedui, who was simultaneously a noble, a war leader and a Druid.

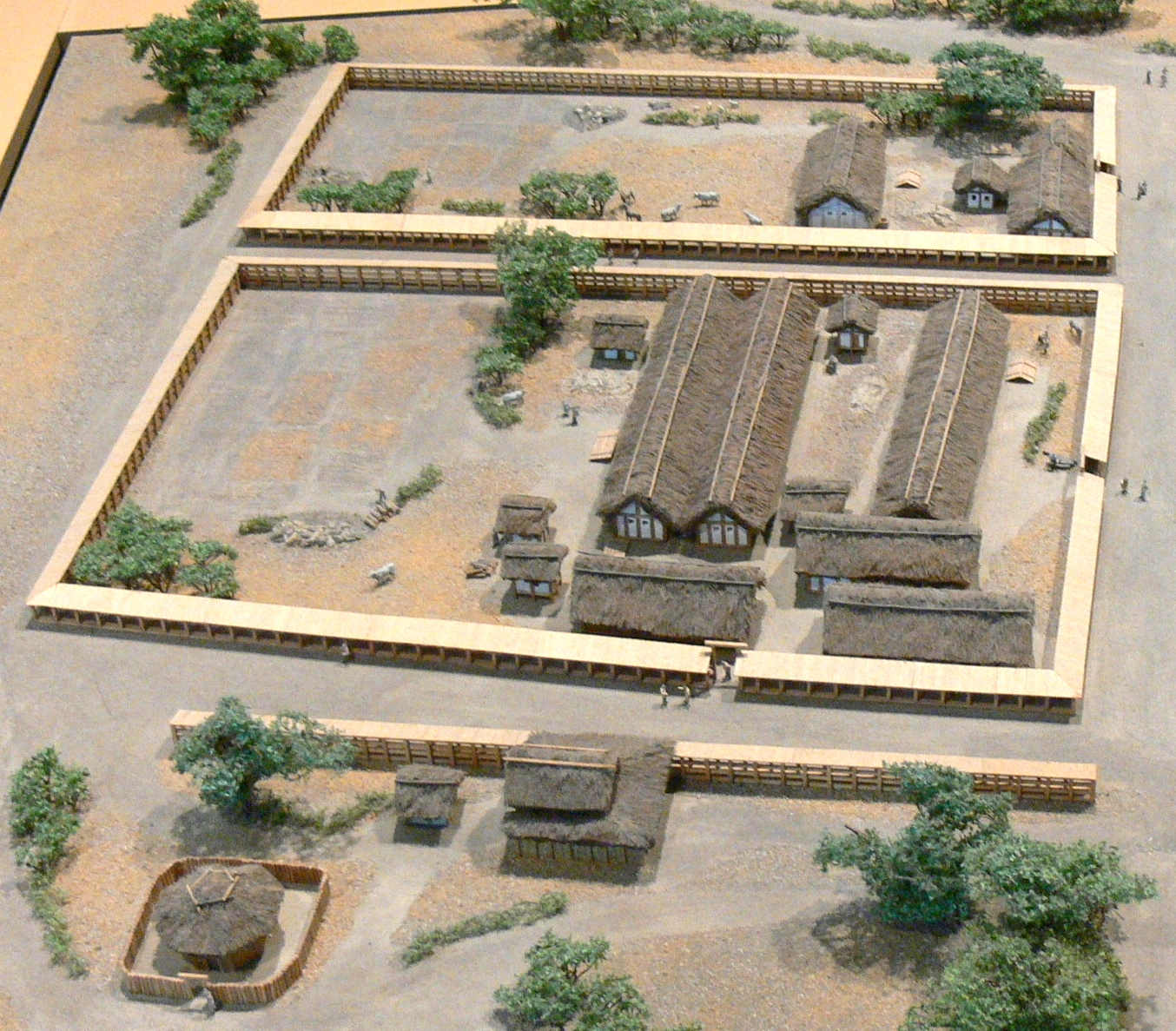
Part of the oppidum of Manching, Germany

==== Druids ====
The Druids were religious leaders as well as legal authorities, adjudicators, lorekeepers, medical professionals and political advisors. Classical accounts describe them as philosophers and teachers who possessed a knowledge of science (natural philosophy), astronomy and mathematics and adhered to 'Pythagorean' beliefs and practices.

"Among all the Gallic peoples, generally speaking, there are three sets of men who are held in exceptional honour; the Bards, the Vates and the Druids. The Bards are singers and poets; the Vates, diviners and natural philosophers; while the Druids, in addition to natural philosophy, study also moral philosophy."

Julius Caesar states that "Of all these Druids one is chief, who has the highest authority among them." The 'chief Druid' could be elected by voting if no pre-eminent candidate was immediately apparent. According to Caesar, at a certain time of the year the Druids would assemble in central Gaul (in the territory of the Carnutes), where they would 'sit in conclave' and judge on disputes between people from all over the country.

==== Education ====
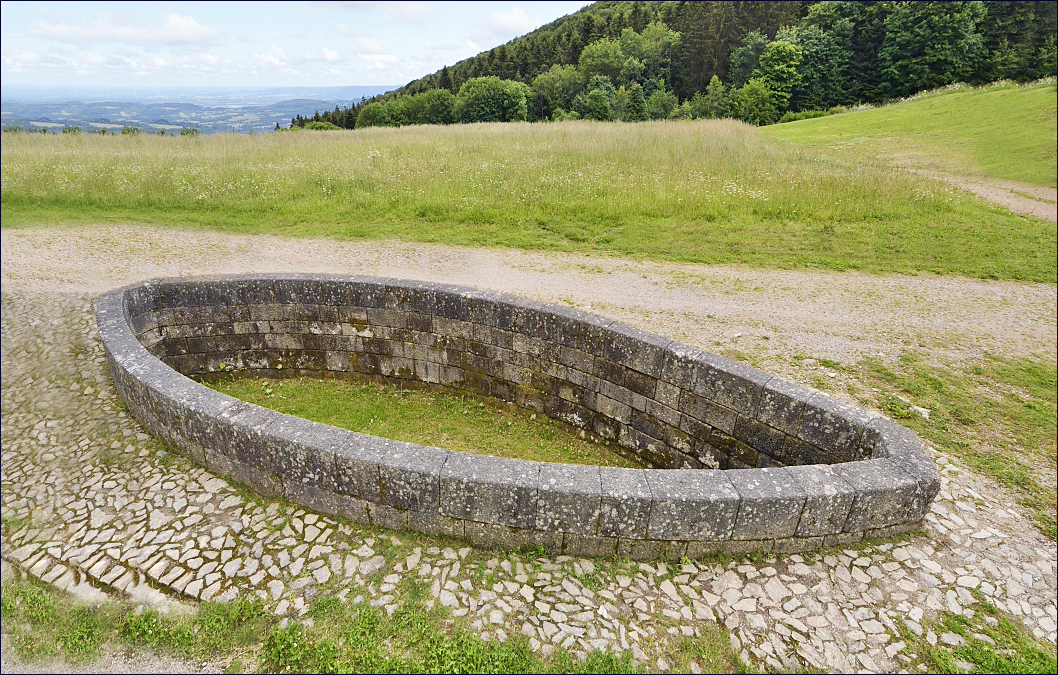
Monumental stone basin at the oppidum of Bibracte, France

Caesar and Pomponius Mela briefly describe the education system of the Druids, which was said to last up to twenty years and involved extensive memorisation of knowledge passed down orally:

"The Druids usually hold aloof from war, and do not pay war‑taxes with the rest; they are excused from military service and exempt from all liabilities. Tempted by these great rewards, many young men assemble of their own motion to receive their training; many are sent by parents and relatives. Report says that in the schools of the Druids they learn by heart a great number of verses, and therefore some persons remain twenty years under training. And they do not think it proper to commit these utterances to writing, although in almost all other matters, and in their public and private accounts, they make use of Greek letters. ... The cardinal doctrine which they seek to teach is that souls do not die, but after death pass from one to another; and this belief, as the fear of death is thereby cast aside, they hold to be the greatest incentive to valour. Besides this, they have many discussions as touching the stars and their movement, the size of the universe and of the earth, the order of nature, the strength and the powers of the immortal gods, and hand down their lore to the young men."

Some modern authors have suggested that the Aeduan oppidum of Bibracte in central France was the site of a Druidic school. A monumental stone basin located in the centre of Bibracte has a sophisticated geometric design based on Pythagorean triangles and incorporates an astronomical alignment, indicating that it may represent a 'Druidic monument'.

The later Aeduan capital of Augustodunum near to Bibracte was the location of the Menian schools, a Roman-era 'university' dedicated to the study of liberal arts and law, where "cadets of the great Gallic families" received a liberal education according to the Roman historian Tacitus.

The Roman author Cicero was personally acquainted with the druid Diviciacus, who travelled to Rome to ask the Senate for military aid against the Sequani, Arverni and Suebi. Cicero writes: "there are indeed Druids in Gaul — for I knew one of them myself, Diviciacus, the Aeduan ... He claimed to have that knowledge of nature which the Greeks call 'physiologia'."

=== Trade ===
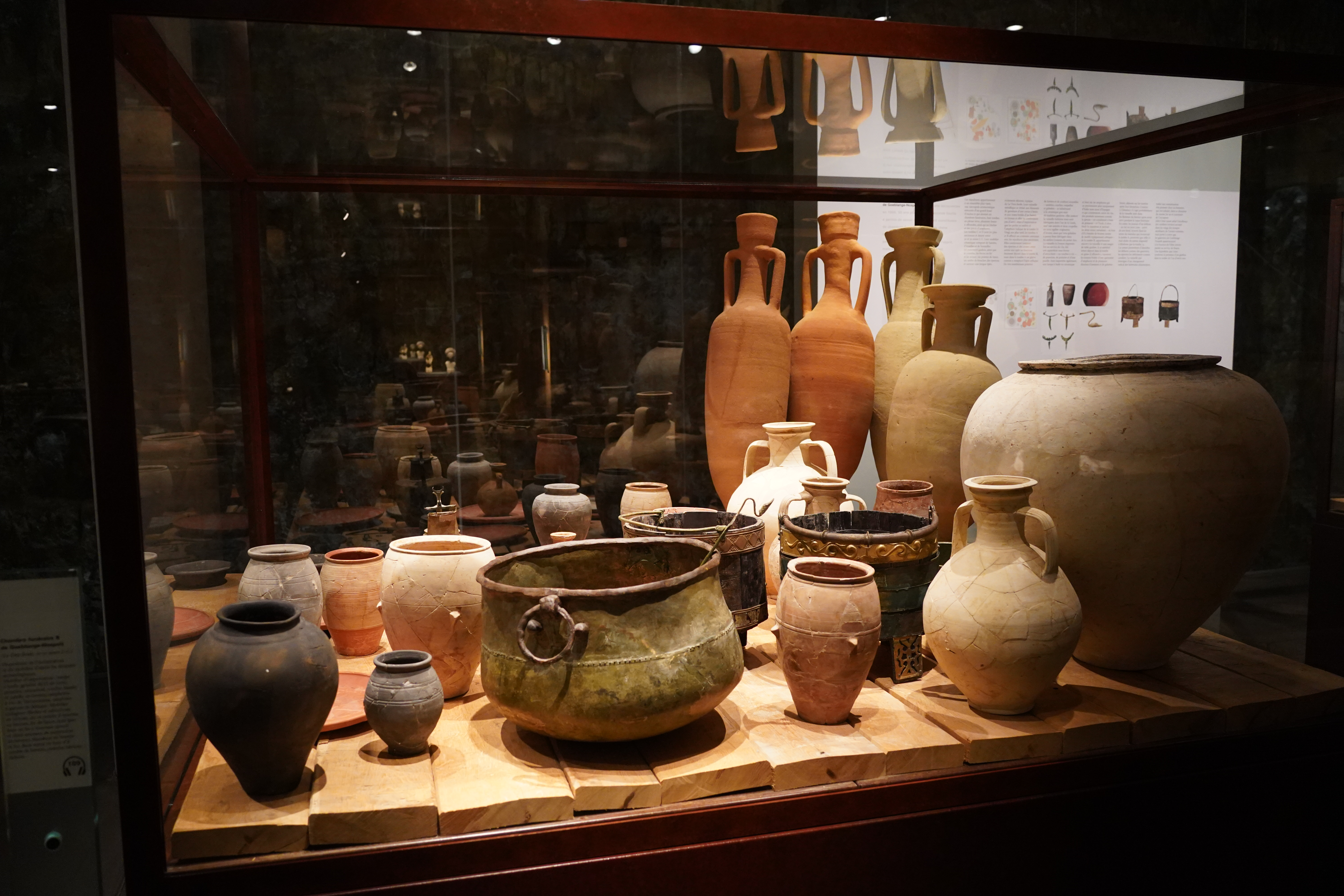
Grave with trade goods from the Titelberg oppidum, Luxembourg, 1st century BC

By the Iron Age, trade operated intensively and extensively throughout Europe. Trade within Celtic lands involved raw materials and manufactured goods, with a large increase in the trade of manufactured goods occurring in the last two centuries BC. Goods were mass produced within the oppida by specialist industrial workers and craftsmen and distributed to surrounding areas. Items such as pottery, iron weapons, bronze vessels and glass jewellery were produced for export. Goods were transported by merchants with packhorses, wagons and on freight boats along rivers, and tolls were charged on trade routes by local rulers or states. Weighing balances and coins are found in both small and large settlements. Ships of Celtic design were used for trade with the British Isles and along the Atlantic coast. Metal production, mining and textile production were noted by the Greek author Strabo, who writes: "among the Petrocorii there are fine iron-works, and also among the Bituriges Cubi; among the Cadurci, linen factories; among the Ruteni, silver mines; and the Gabales, also, have silver mines." Exports from La Tène cultural areas to the Mediterranean cultures included salt, tin, copper, amber, wool, leather, furs and gold, whilst wine, luxury products and materials such as coral were imported northwards from the Mediterranean region.

=== Writing ===
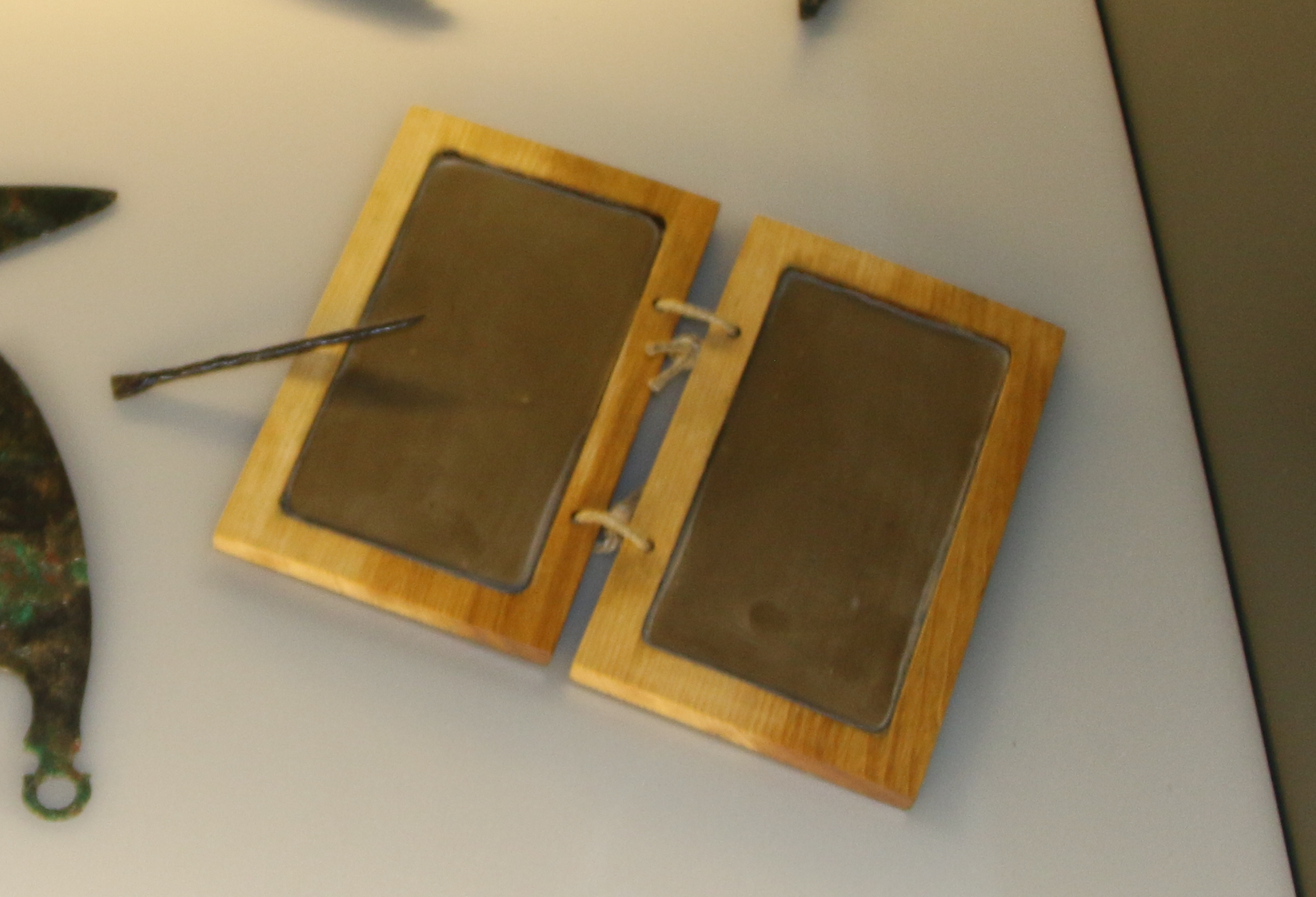
Wax writing tablet (replica) and stylus, Bibracte Museum, France

Some Celtic-language inscriptions are known from this period, written in Lepontic, Greek and Latin scripts. Writing appears on Celtic coins (such as the names of Celtic rulers or peoples), and writing equipment in the form of wax tablets and styli has also been found within settlements. Markings on pottery have been interpreted as a possible distinct 'La Tène alphabet'. Historical accounts by Greek and Roman authors provide descriptions of the use of writing by Celtic peoples at this time, such as the keeping of public records.

"In the camp of the Helveti were found, and brought to Caesar, records written out in Greek letters, wherein was drawn up a nominal register showing what number of them had gone out from their homeland, who were able to bear arms, and also separately children, old men, and women."

=== Coinage ===
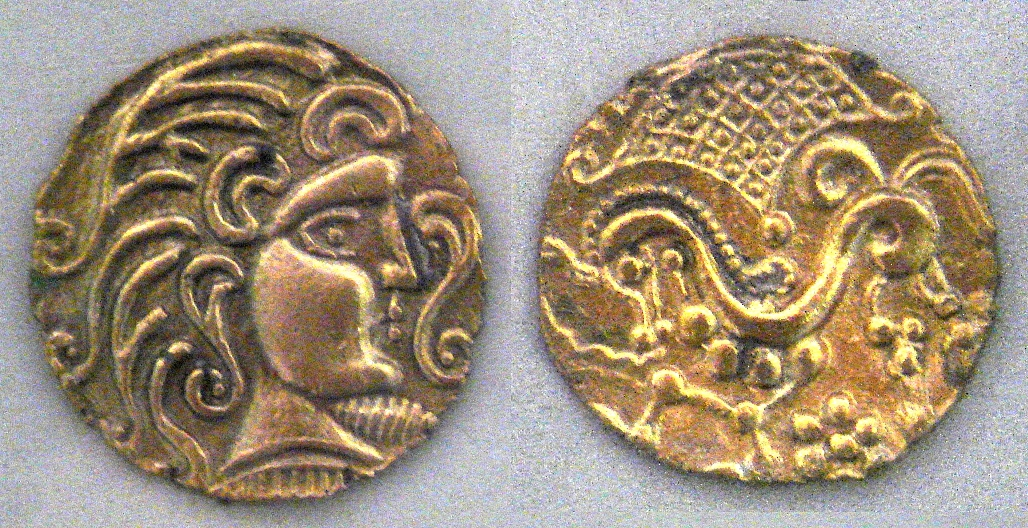
Gold coin of the Parisii, France, with a stylised depiction of a horse on the reverse side (right)

Celtic coinage originated in the late 4th century BC in a period of intensified contact with Greek states through trade and the employment of Celtic mercenaries in Greek armies. Coins were minted by individual Celtic rulers or states and are found in large quantities in settlements and hoards throughout Europe. Designs on coins include stylized portraits, abstract symbols, mythological imagery (including motifs such as the solar boat), and possibly star constellations such as the Pleiades. Coins were made from gold, silver and bronze and were used for official payments, taxes, tribute, fines, religious offerings, dowries and other customary payments.

=== Technology ===
The La Tène period saw a vast increase in iron production, with huge quantities and varieties of iron objects becoming common on all types of settlements. According to Collis (2010), "iron industry and coin use were more advanced than in the Mediterranean, and indicate indigenous changes." By the second century BC, 200 distinct types of iron tools were in common use, serving a wide range of purposes. Iron nails used in the production of Murus Gallicus were mass-produced in enormous quantities. The oppidum of Manching is estimated to have used many tons of nails just in the construction of its outer wall. The production of high-carbon steel is also attested from c. 500 BC. By the 1st century BC Noric steel was famous for its quality and was sought after by the Roman military.

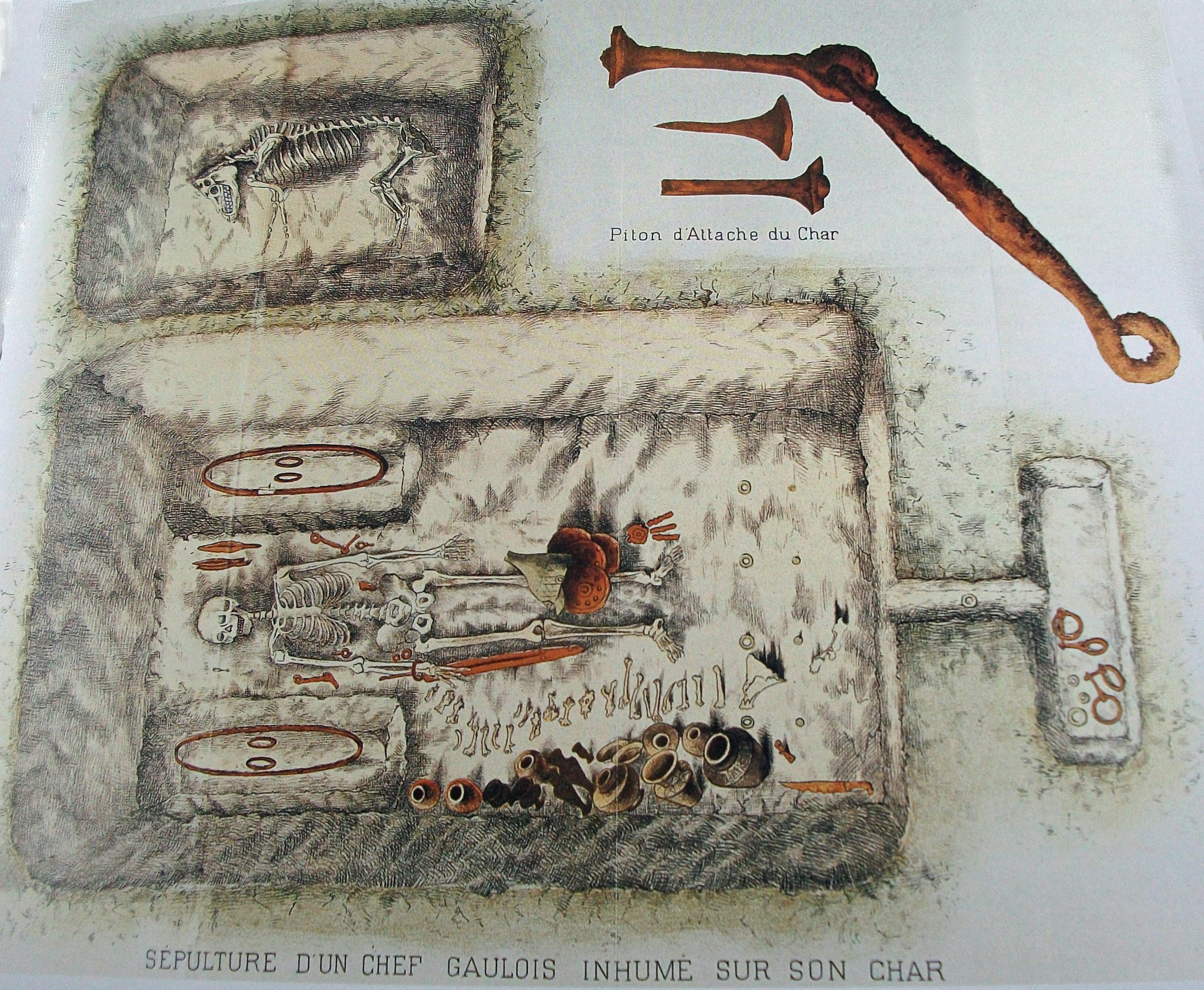
Catalauni chariot burial from Châlons, France, 4th century BC. Excavation drawing from 1901

Technological developments by Celtic craftsmen in this period include the invention of shrunk-on iron tyres for wagons and chariots, the creation of wagons with front-axel steering, and the incorporation of roller-bearings within wheel hubs. Chariots are thought to have incorporated suspension systems made from tightened ropes or leather straps to reduce vibrations during movement on uneven ground. In the 1st century BC the Greek historian Diodorus Siculus noted that "In their journeyings and when they go into battle the Gauls use chariots drawn by two horses." Chariots were used in warfare until the later La Tène period, continuing in use in Britain until the late 1st century BC.

According to Julius Caesar trade with the British Isles was dominated by the Veneti from Armorica, who commanded "a very great number of ships", which he described as follows:

"The ships were built wholly of oak, and designed to endure any force and violence whatever; the benches which were made of planks a foot in breadth, were fastened by iron spikes of the thickness of a man's thumb; the anchors were secured fast by iron chains instead of cables, and for sails they used skins and thin dressed leather."

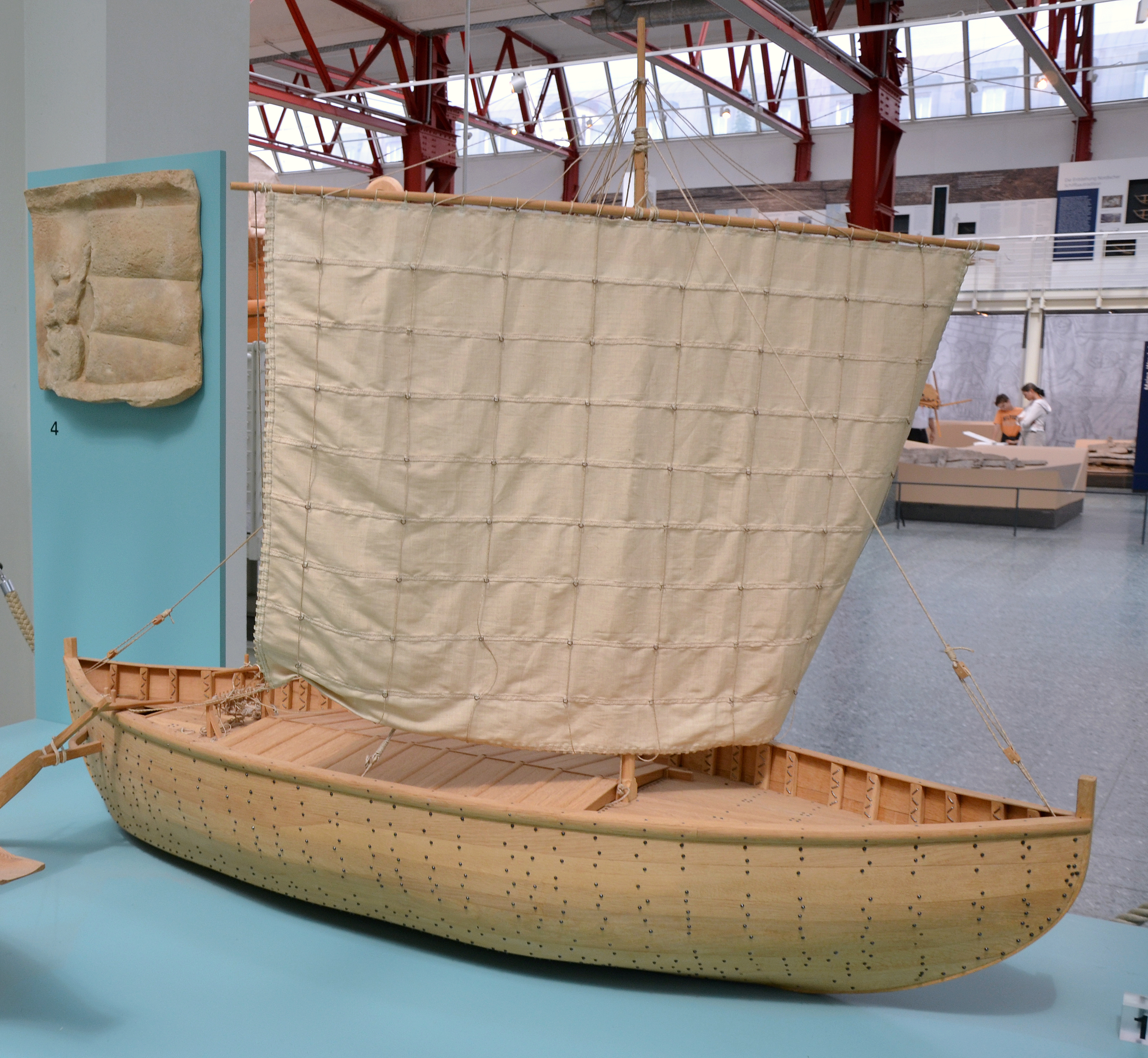
Model of the Blackfriars I ship

Close similarities have been noted between Caesar's description and shipwrecks discovered at Blackfriars in London (dating from the 2nd century AD) and at St Peter Port in Guernsey (dating from the 3rd century AD), which are described as indigenous Romano-Celtic ships built according to a native Celtic tradition, distinct from that of the Mediterranean. McGrail (1995) suggests that the frame-first construction process of these ships represents a specific Celtic ship-building innovation.

Wooden barrels bound with metal hoops were also invented by Celtic craftsmen during the La Tène period and gradually replaced the use of amphorae within the Roman empire from the 2nd century AD.

The 3rd century BC saw the development of iron chain mail, the invention of which is credited to Celtic armourers by the Roman author Varro. Celtic helmet designs also served as the basis for the design of Roman imperial helmets following Caesar's campaigns in Gaul. The spatha, a long sword of Celtic design, was introduced to the Romans by Celtic mercenaries and auxiliaries, gradually becoming a standard heavy infantry weapon within the Roman army by the 2nd century AD and replacing the earlier gladius.

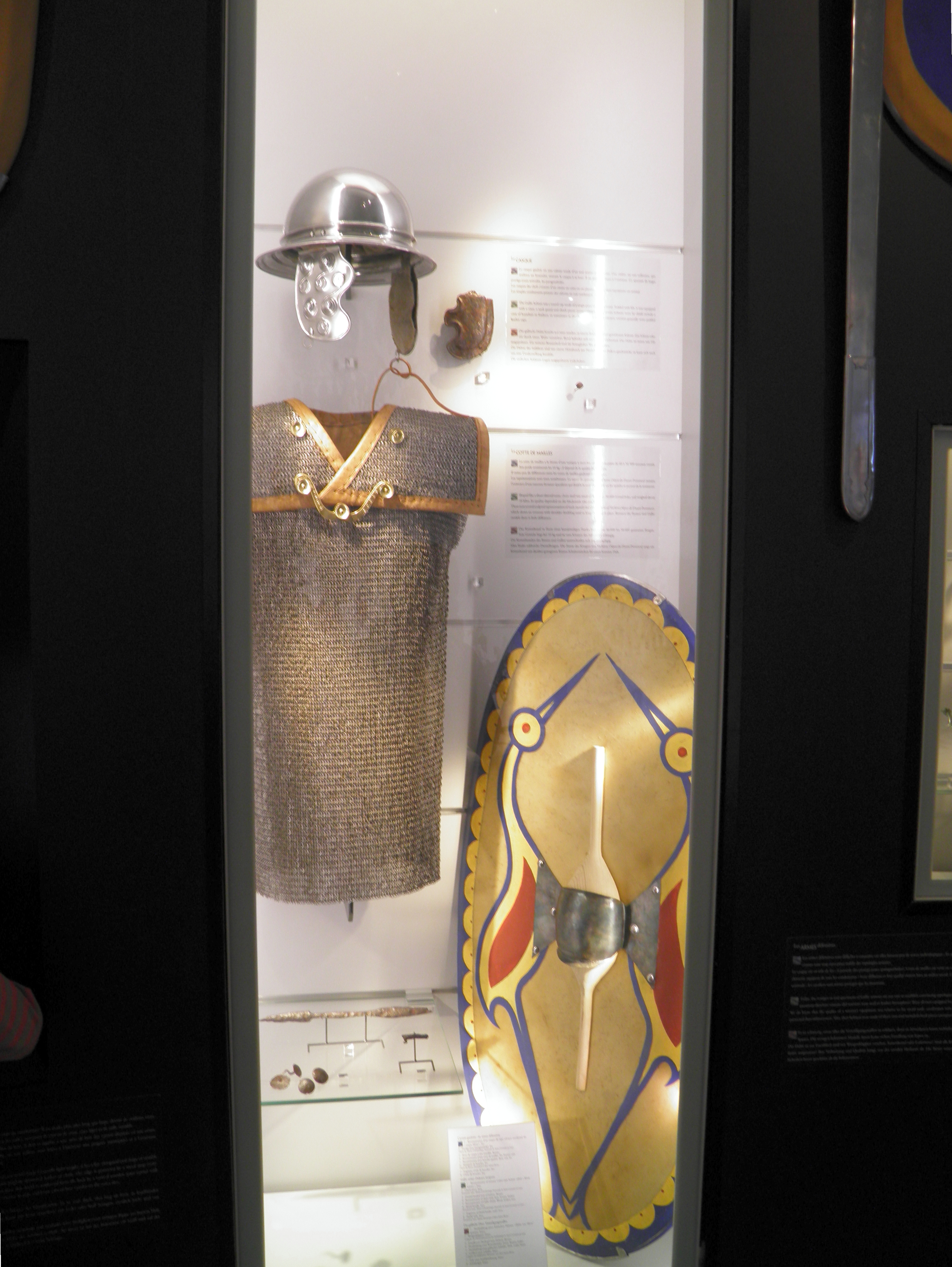
Gaulish military equipment and chain mail, MuséoParc Alésia

The 1st century Roman author Pliny the Elder attributed the invention of soap and mattresses to the Gauls. The 2nd century Greek physician Aretaeus of Cappadocia also attributed the invention of soap to the Gauls.

At the site of the oppidum of Paule in Brittany the remains of a wooden structure thought to be a 'machine for drawing water' incorporating a crank and connecting-rod mechanism were discovered at the bottom of a well, dating from 68-27 BC. This is the earliest known evidence for such a mechanism, which is also known from later Roman machines. In his account of the siege of Avaricum Julius Caesar provides a brief glimpse of other devices used by the Gauls:

"To the extraordinary valor of our soldiers, devices of every sort were opposed by the Gauls; since they are a nation of consummate ingenuity, and most skillful in imitating and making those things which are imparted by any one; for they turned aside the hooks with nooses, and when they had caught hold of them firmly, drew them on by means of engines, and undermined the mound the more skillfully on this account, because there are in their territories extensive iron mines, and consequently every description of mining operations is known and practiced by them."

=== Clothing ===
The Greek historian Diodorus Siculus gives the following description of Gallic clothing and armour:

"The clothing they wear is striking — shirts which have been dyed and embroidered in varied colours, and breeches, which they call in their tongue bracae; and they wear striped coats, fastened by a buckle on the shoulder, heavy for winter wear and light for summer, in which are set checks, close together and of varied hues. For armour they use long shields, as high as a man, which are wrought in a manner peculiar to them, some of them even having the figures of animals embossed on them in bronze, and these are skilfully worked with an eye not only to beauty but also to protection. On their heads they put bronze helmets which have large embossed figures standing out from them and give an appearance of great size to those who wear them; for in some cases horns are attached to the helmet so as to form a single piece, in other cases images of the fore-parts of birds or four-footed animals. ... Some of them have iron cuirasses, chain-wrought, but others are satisfied with the armour which Nature has given them and go into battle naked. In place of the short sword they carry long broad-swords which are hung on chains of iron or bronze and are worn along the right flank. And some of them gather up their shirts with belts plated with gold or silver."

=== Art and music ===
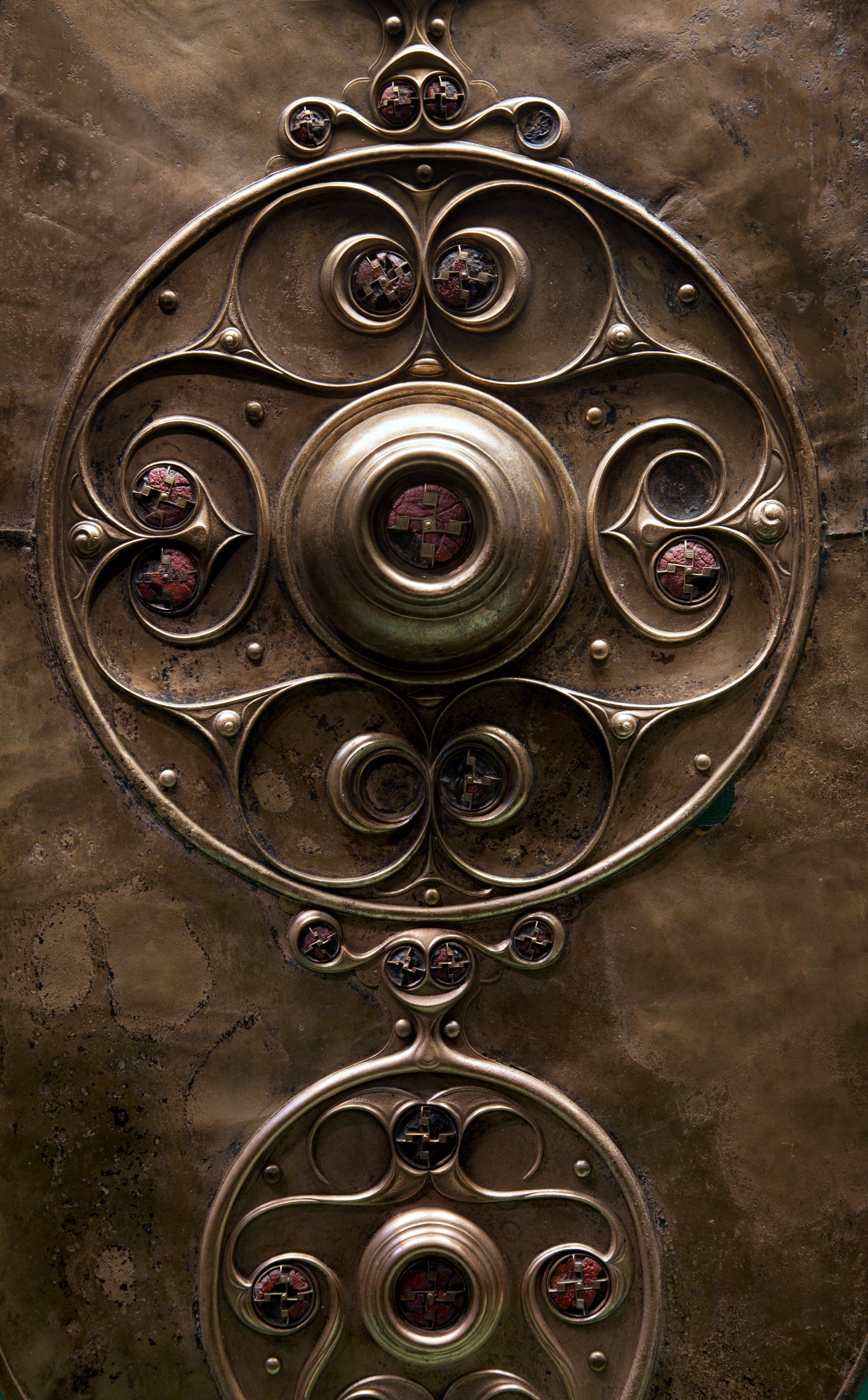
Detail of the Battersea Shield, Britain, c. 350–50 BC

La Tène metalwork in bronze, iron and gold, developing technologically out of Hallstatt culture, is stylistically characterized by inscribed and inlaid intricate spirals and interlace, on fine bronze vessels, helmets and shields, horse trappings, and elite jewelry, especially the neck rings called torcs and elaborate clasps called fibulae. It is characterized by elegant, stylized curvilinear animal and vegetal forms, allied with the Hallstatt traditions of geometric patterning.

The Early Style of La Tène art and culture mainly featured static, geometric decoration, while the transition to the Developed Style constituted a shift to movement-based forms, such as triskeles. Some subsets within the Developed Style contain more specific design trends, such as the recurrent serpentine scroll of the Waldalgesheim Style.

La Tène objects frequently feature complex designs based on geometric principles and precisely laid out with the use of compasses, displaying a sophisticated knowledge of geometry as well as other aspects of mathematics. A similar knowledge of geometry is displayed in the design of the monumental stone basin of Bibracte.

Mythological themes are also depicted in La Tène art, often in a highly stylized, abstracted or decorative form.

Evidence for music in this period includes sculptures of lyre players, thought to be Bards (e.g. at the oppidum of Paule in Brittany, France), and fragmentary remains of string instruments. Large metal horns known as Carnyxes have been found in various locations, as well as artistic depictions of horn players such as on the Gunderstrup cauldron. Diodorus Siculus gave a brief description of Celtic Bards in his 1st century BC account of the Gauls:

"Among them are also to be found lyric poets whom they call Bards. These men sing to the accompaniment of instruments which are like lyres, and their songs may be either of praise or of obloquy."

=== Burial rites ===
Burial sites included weapons, chariots, and both elite and household goods, evoking a strong continuity with an afterlife.

La Tène peoples also dug ritual shafts, in which votive offerings and even human sacrifices were cast. Severed heads (particularly of defeated enemies) appear to have held great power and were often represented in carvings. Ritual depositions of were also made into lakes and rivers, such as the La Tène site in Switzerland.

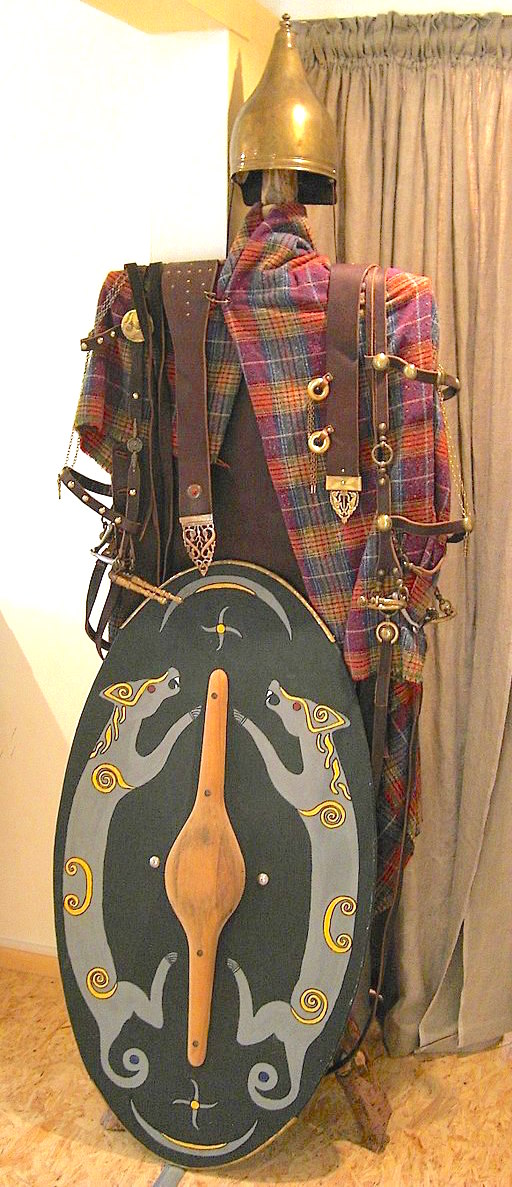
Celtic warrior garments (reconstruction)

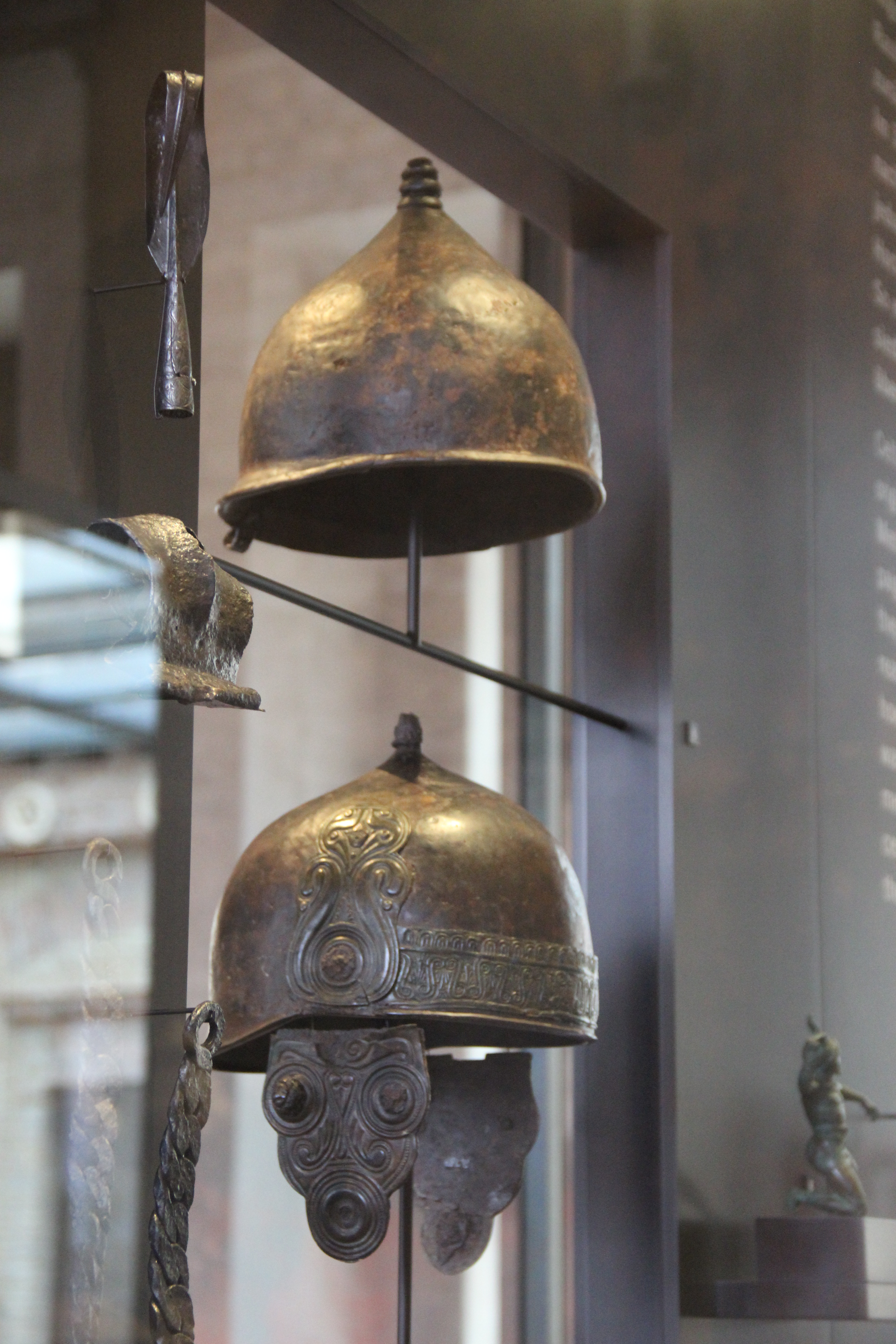
Bronze helmets, Germany

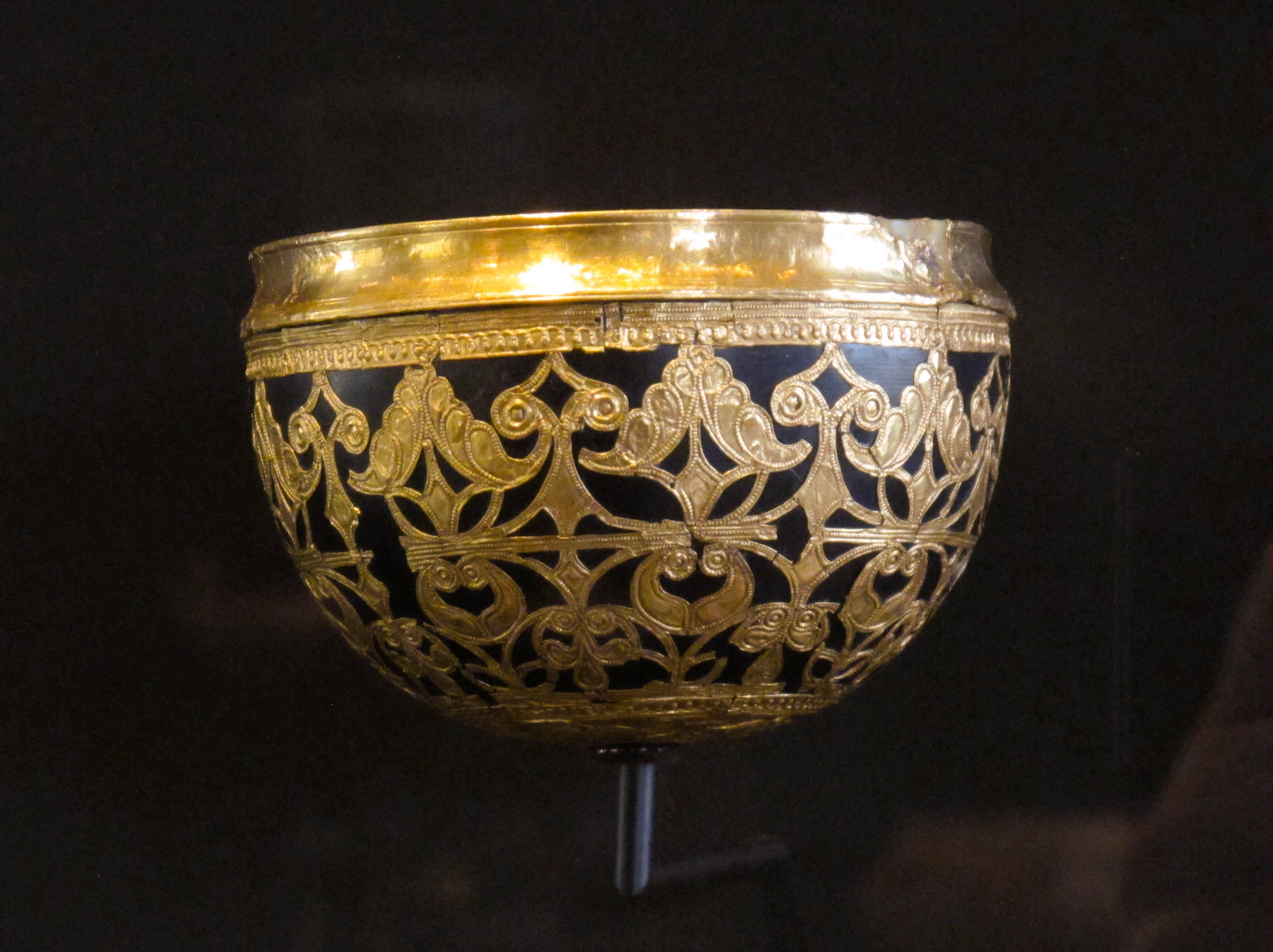
Gold chariot axle cover, Germany, 4th century BC

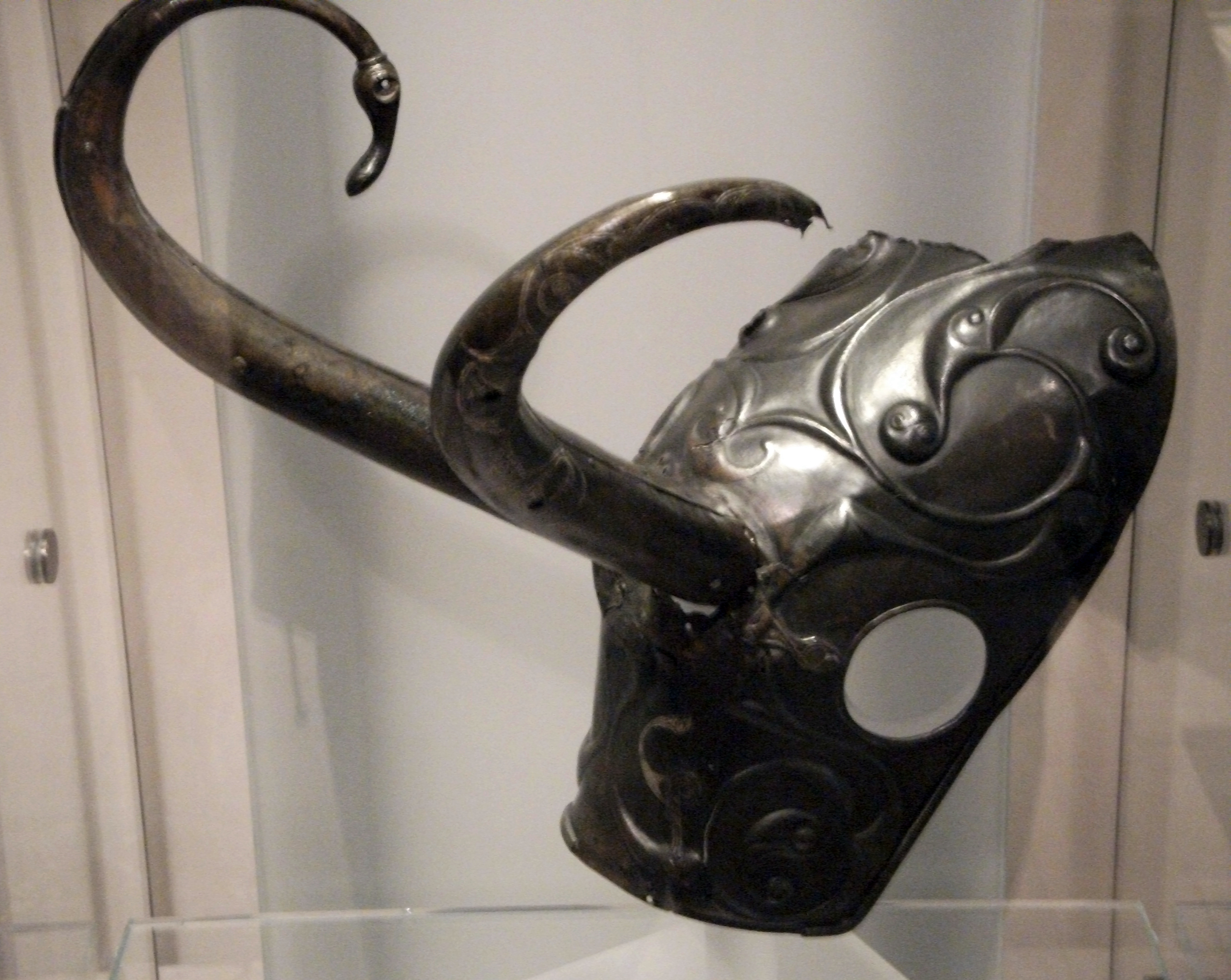
Torrs Pony-cap, Scotland, c. 200 BC

Bronze vessels from Waldalgesheim, Germany

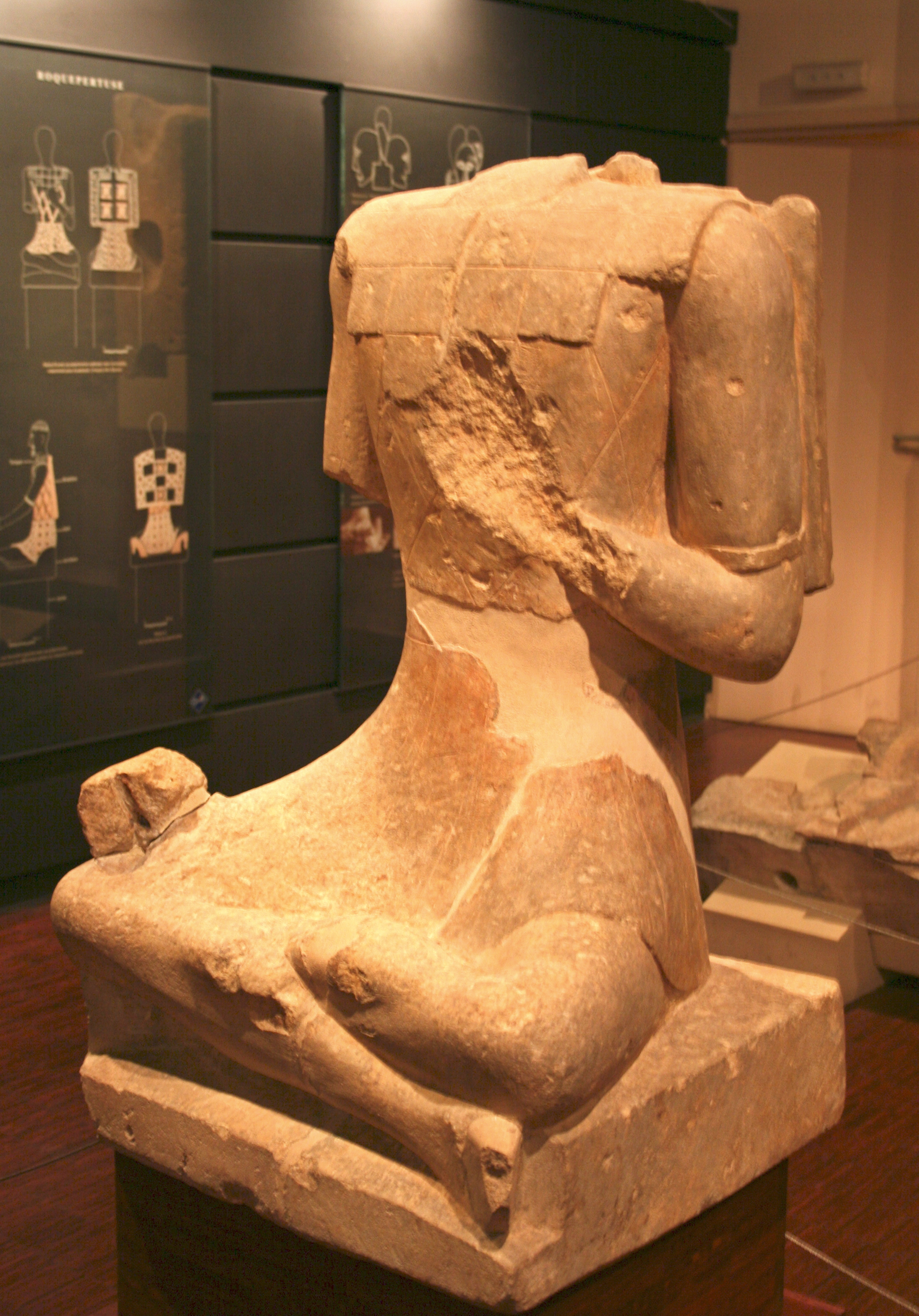
Stone statue, Roquepertuse, France

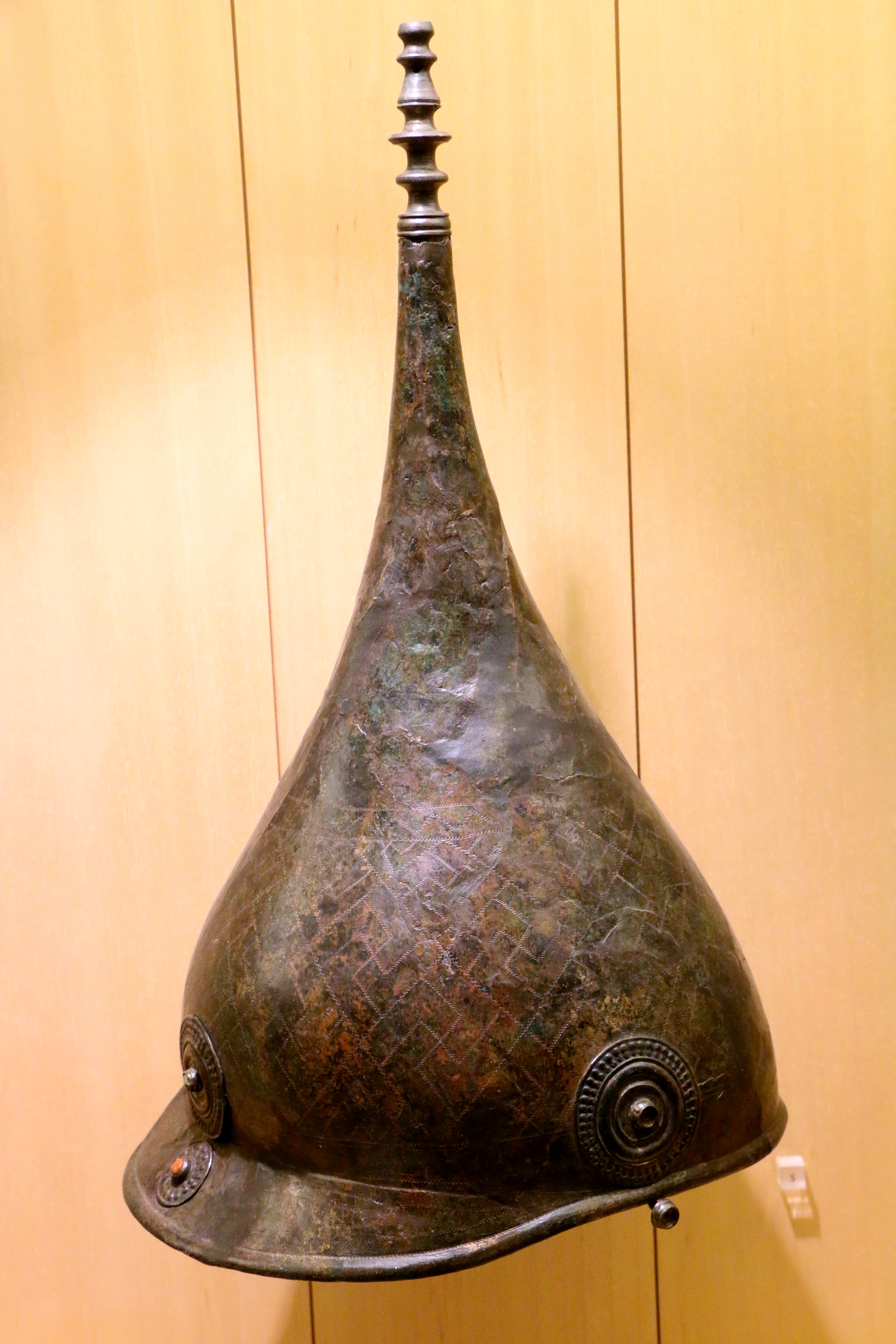
Gaulish bronze helmet, France, 4th century BC

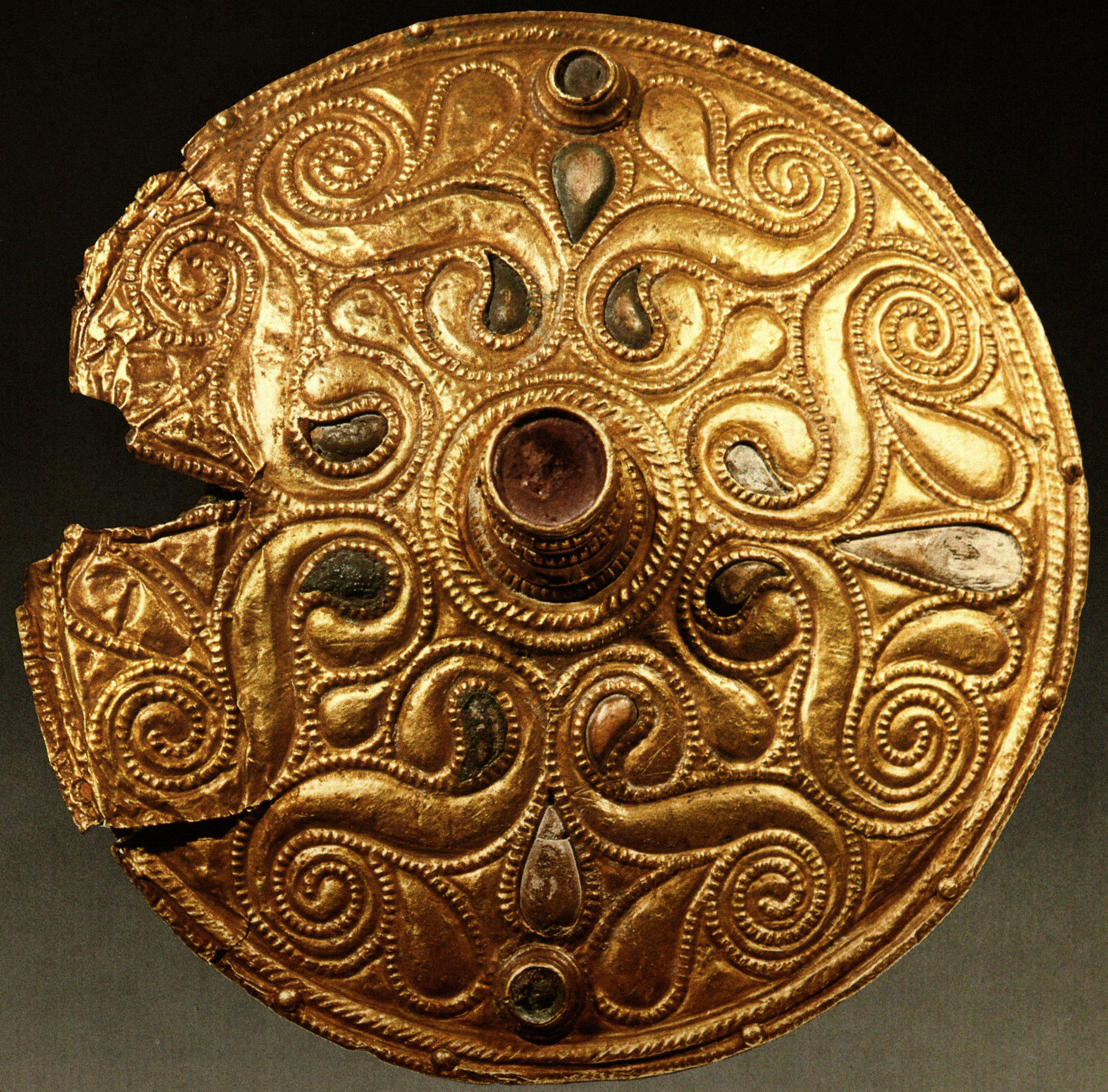
Celtic gold-plated disc, France, 4th century BC

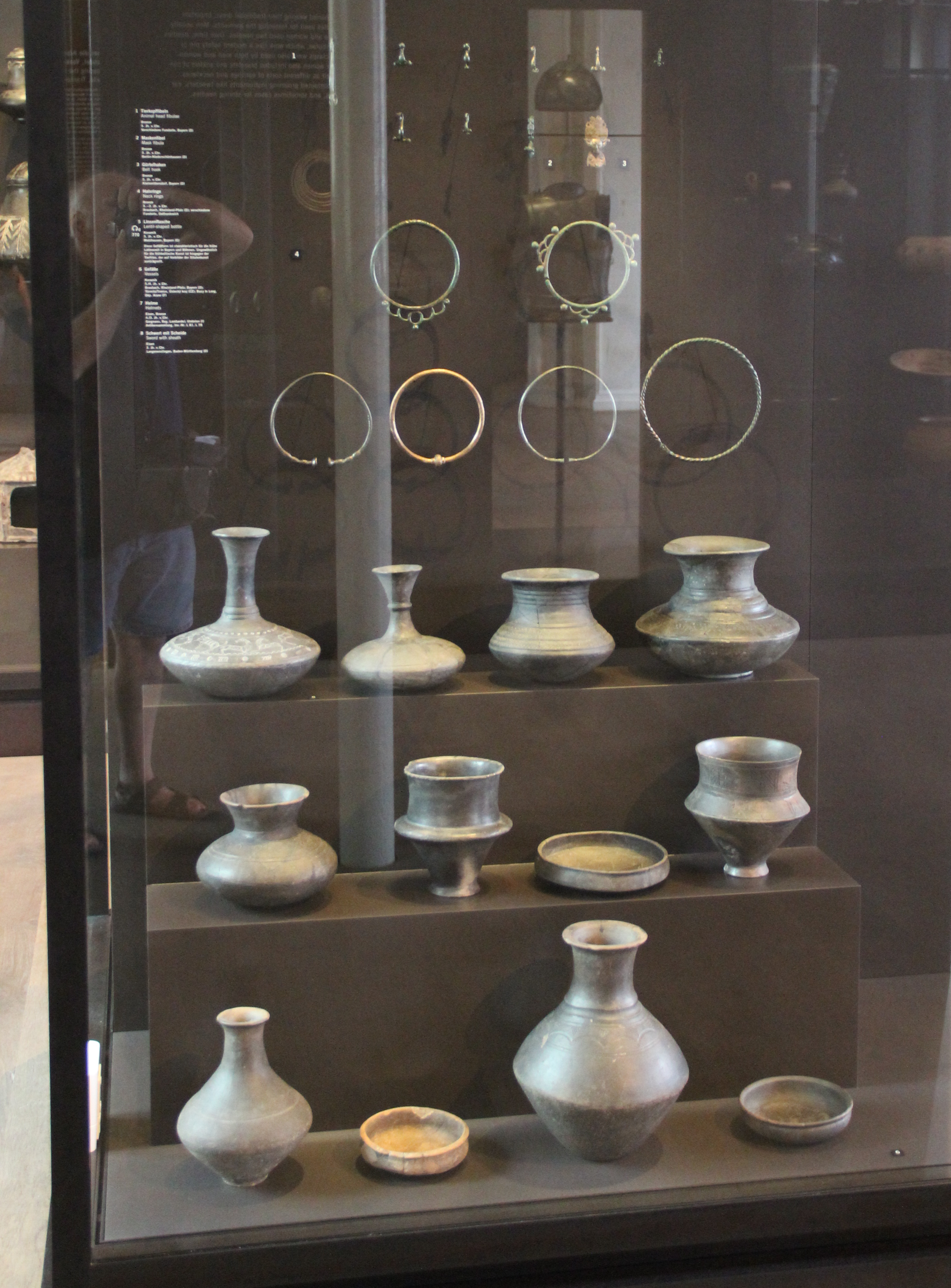
Burial goods including pottery and torc necklaces

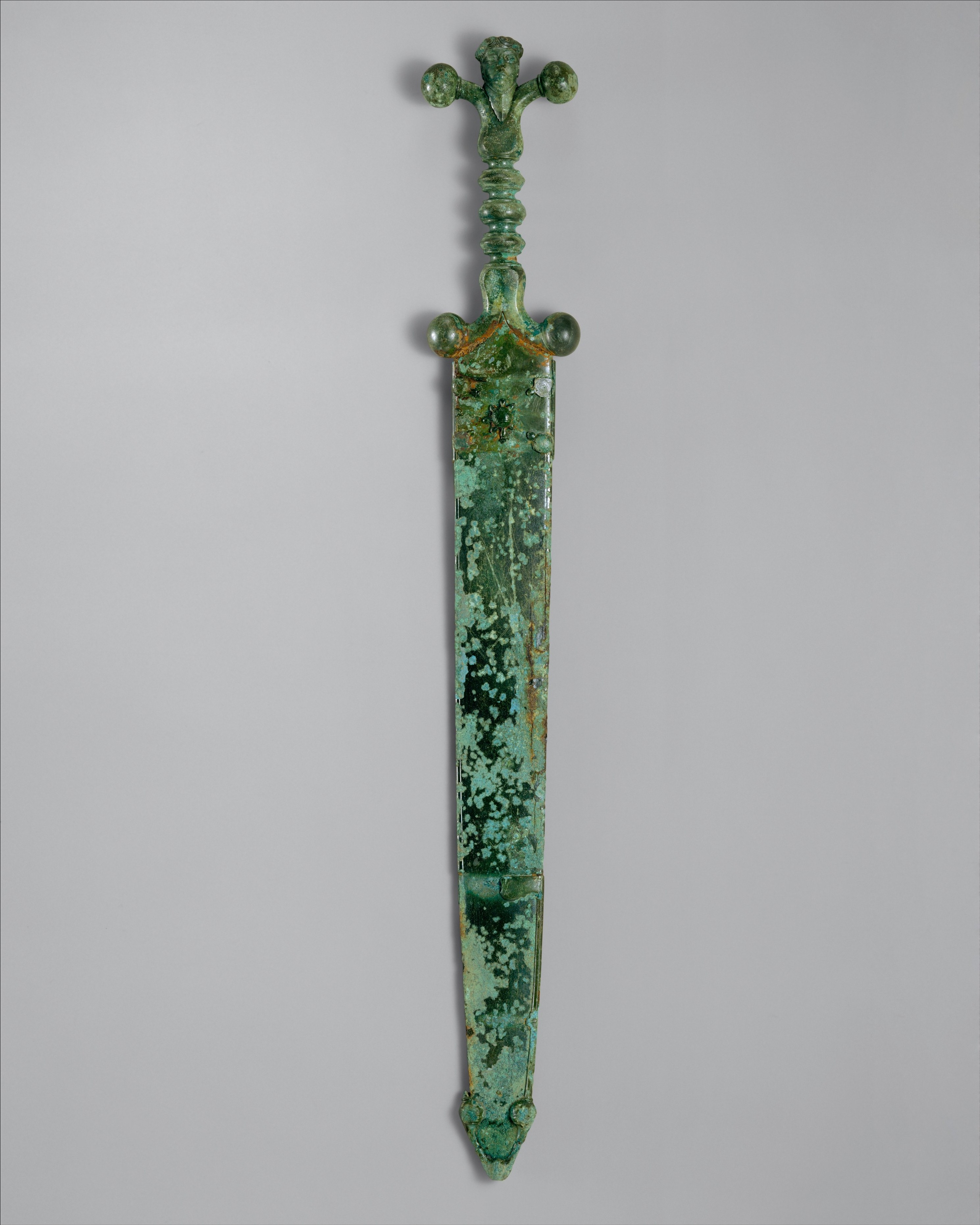
Celtic short sword, c. 60 BC

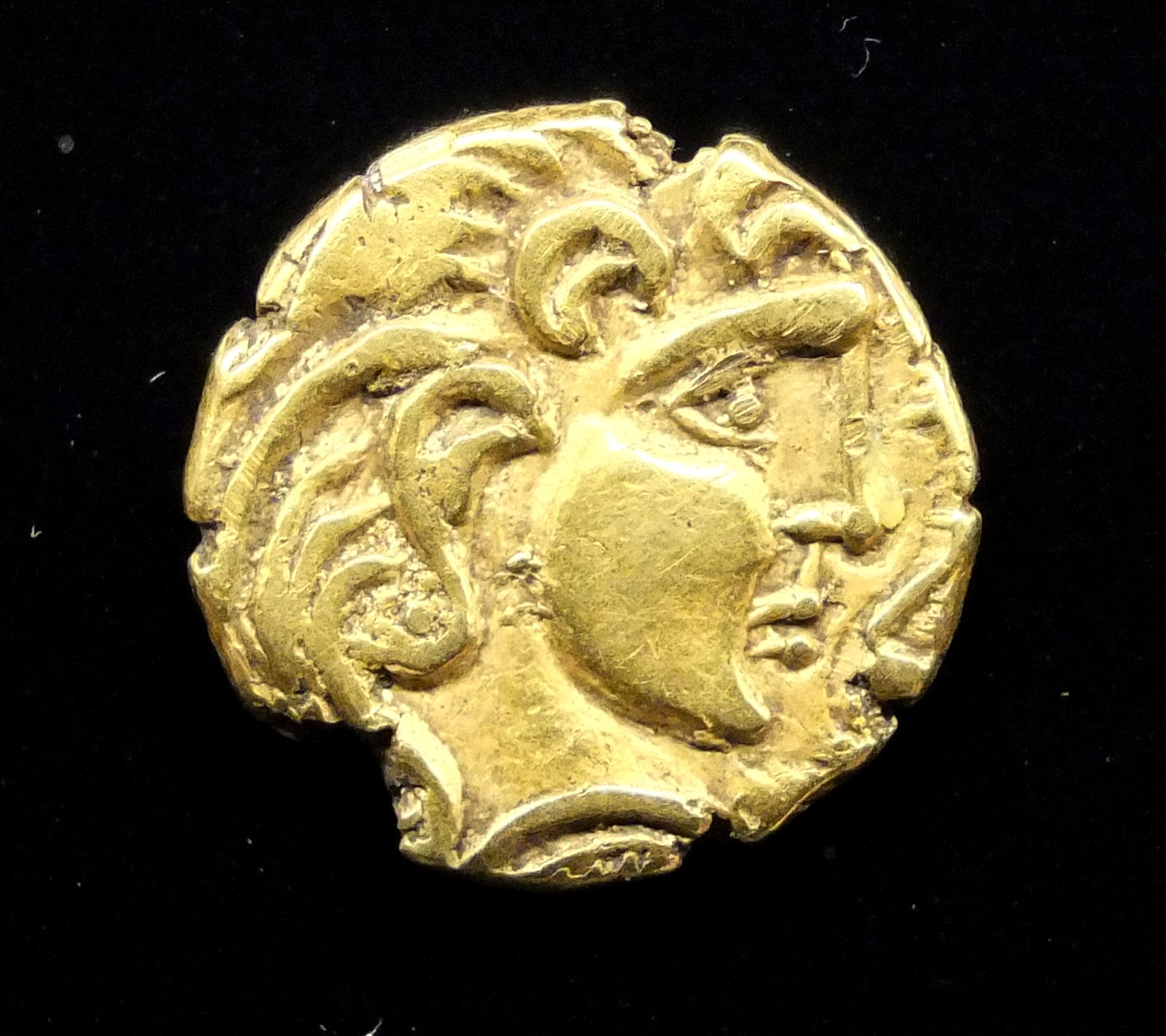
Gallic gold coin, France

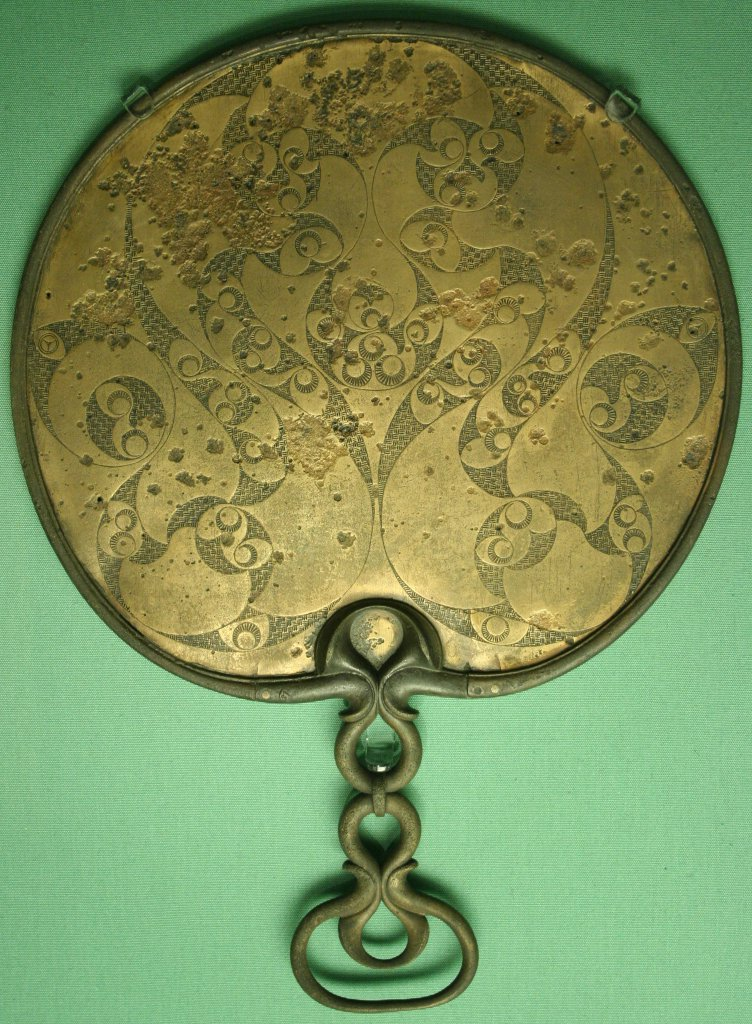
Celtic mirror, England, c. 50 BC

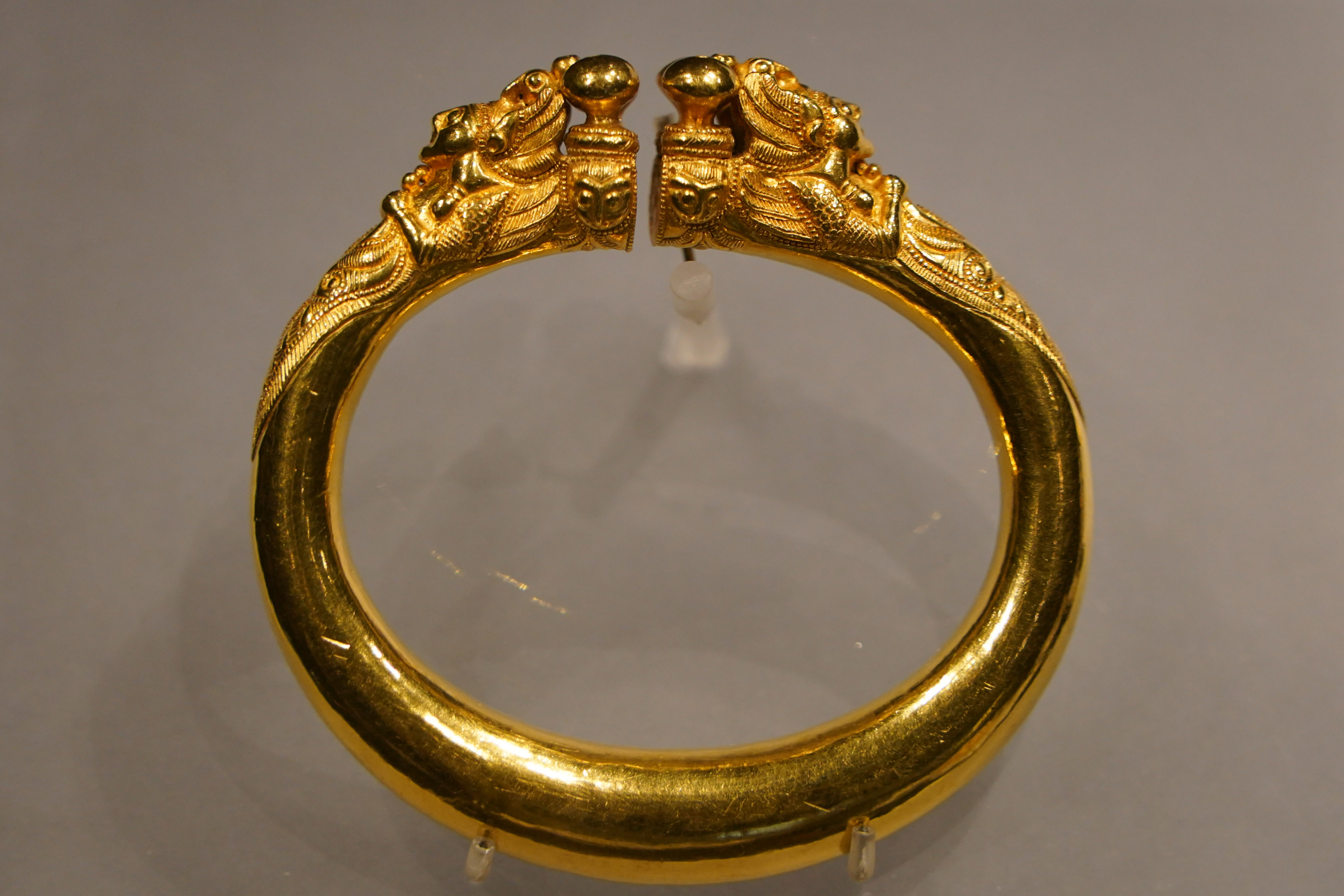
Gold bracelet, Reinheim, Germany, c. 370 BC

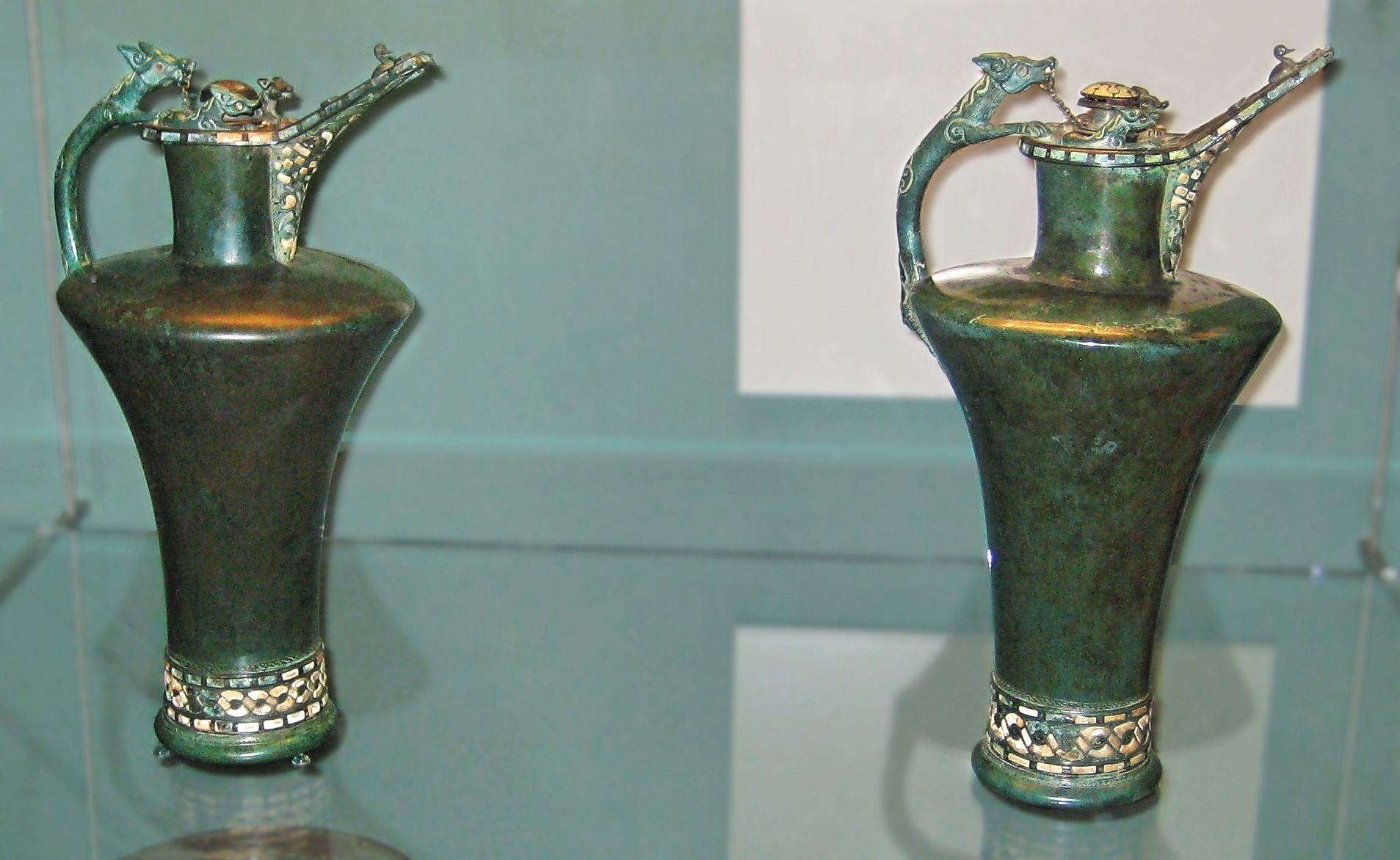
Flagons from Basse Yutz, France, 5th century BC

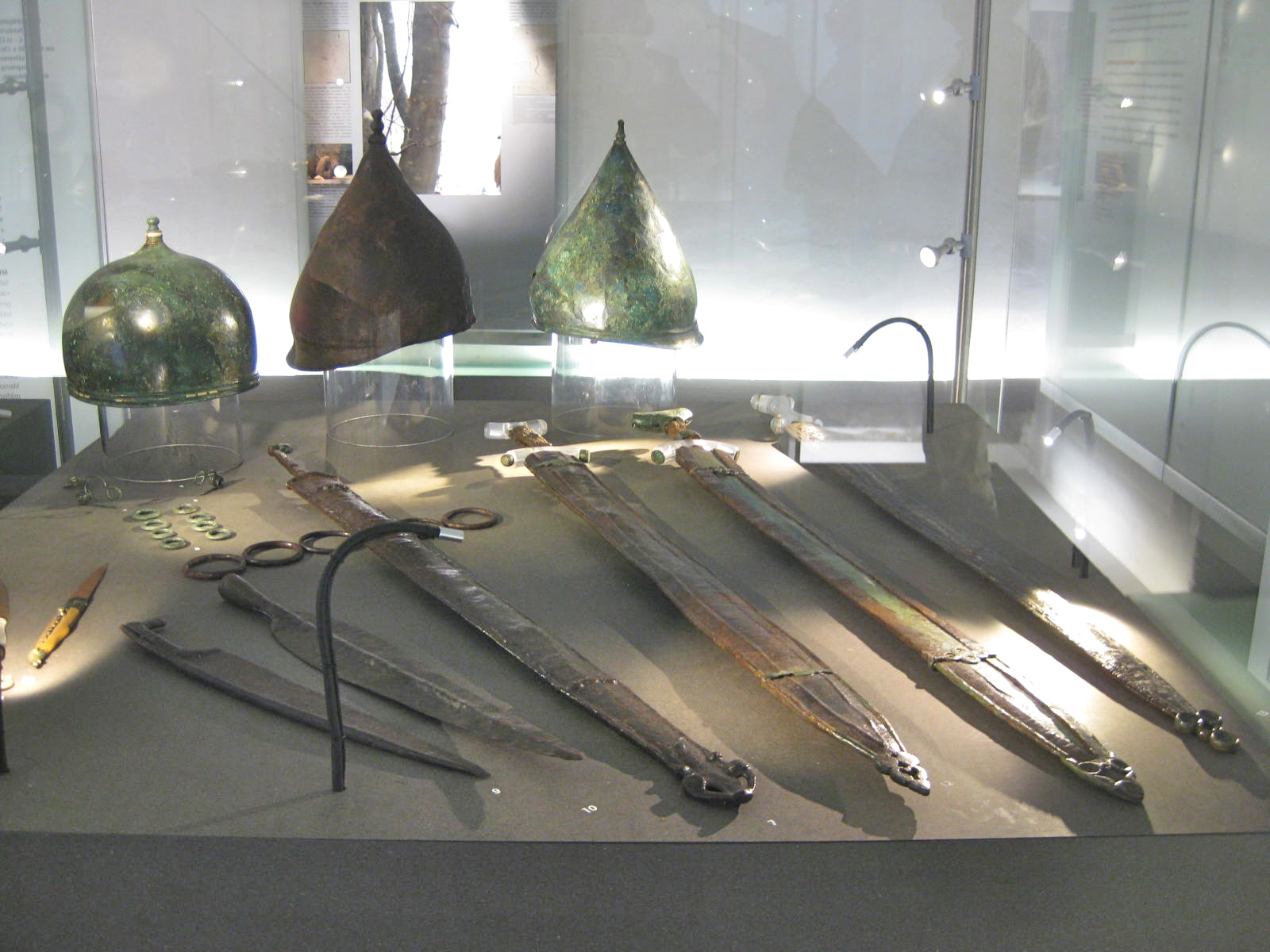
Swords and helmets from Hallein, Austria, 4th century BC

== Type site ==
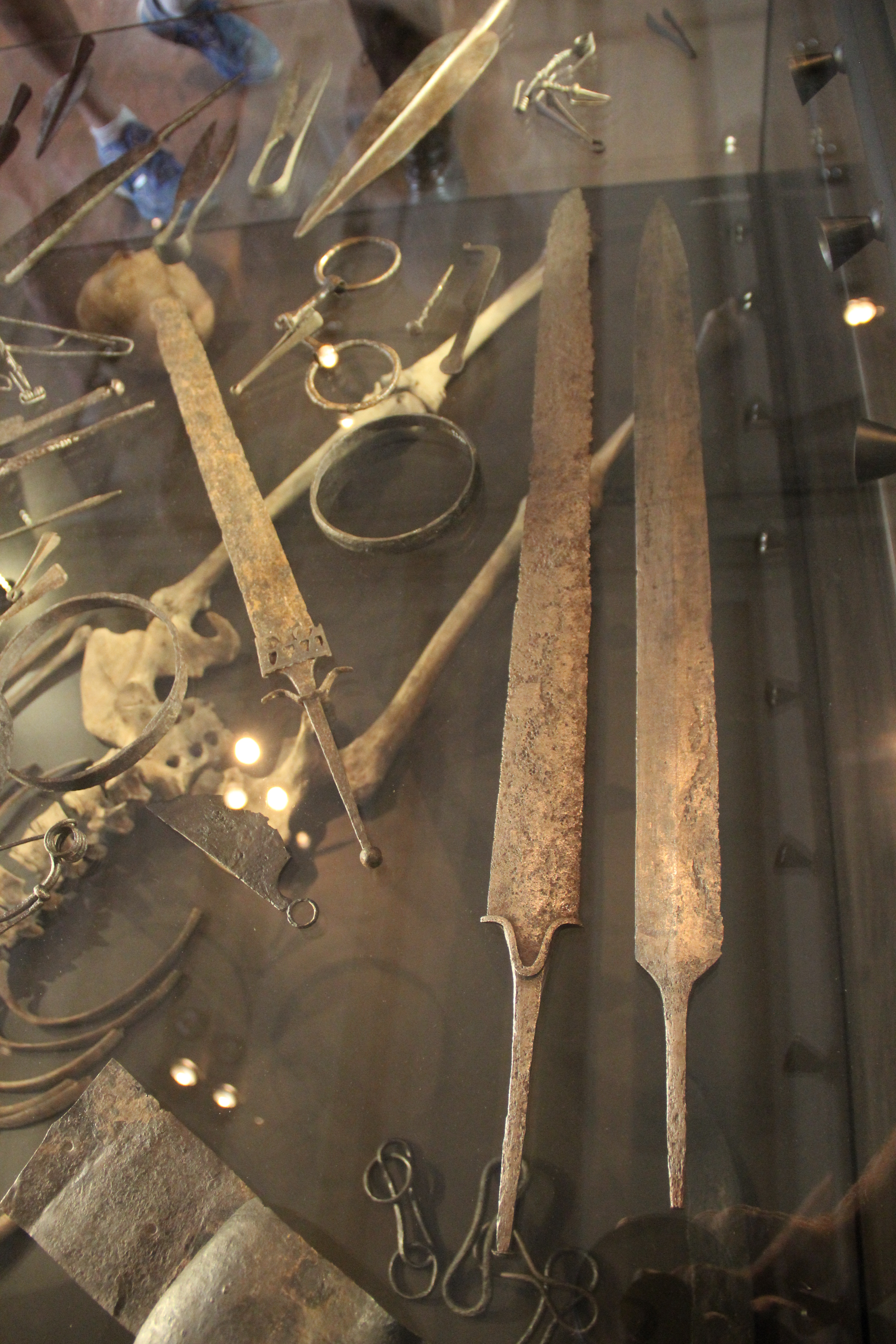
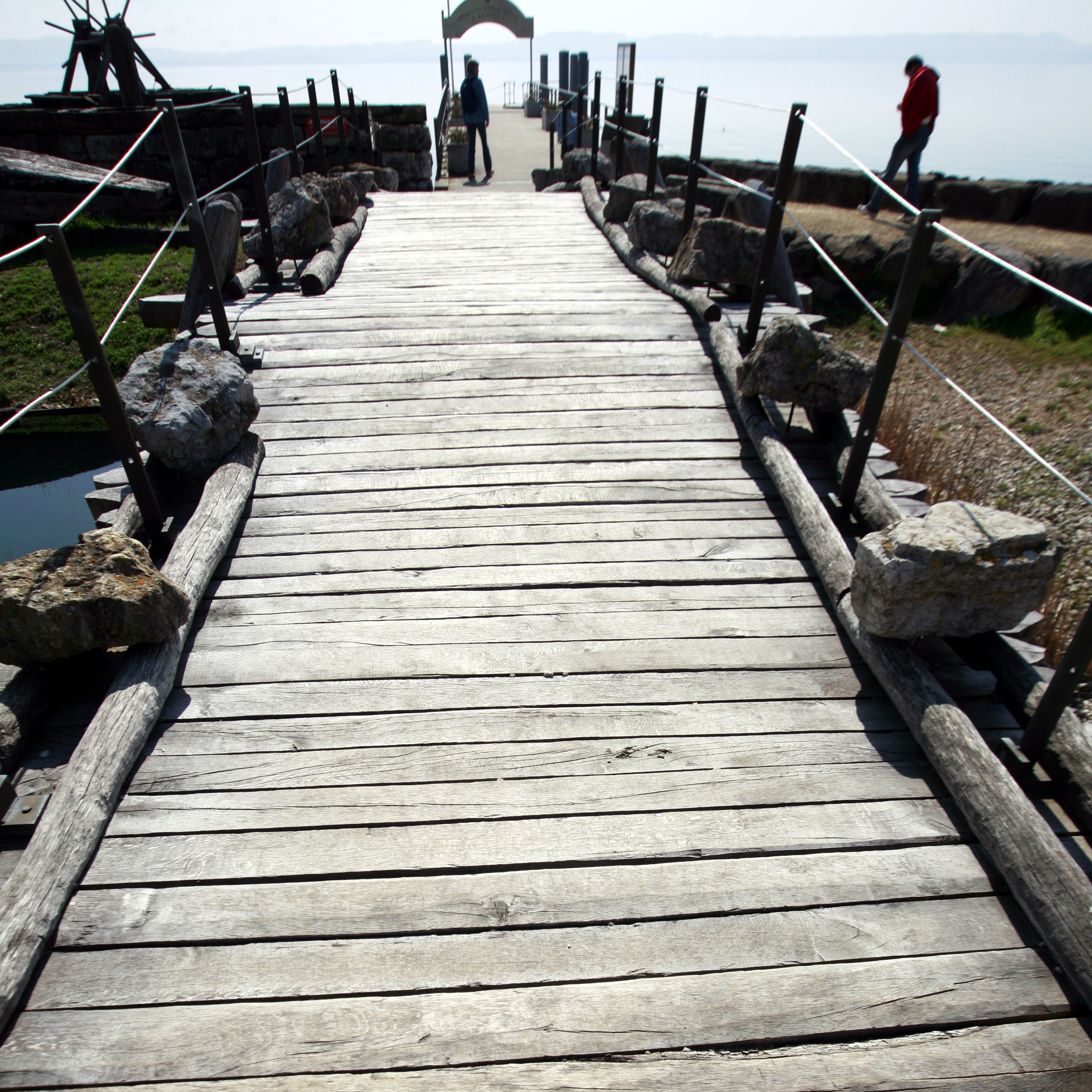
Left: Lake depositions at La Tène. Right: Reconstructed bridge at the La Tène site, Switzerland

The La Tène type site is on the northern shore of Lake Neuchâtel, Switzerland, where the small river Thielle, connecting to another lake, enters the Lake Neuchâtel. In 1857, prolonged drought lowered the waters of the lake by about 2 m (6 ft 7 in). On the northernmost tip of the lake, between the river and a point south of the village of Epagnier (47.0045°N 7.016°E), Hansli Kopp, looking for antiquities for Colonel Frédéric Schwab, discovered several rows of wooden piles that still reached up about 50 cm (20 in) into the water. From among these, Kopp collected about forty iron swords.

The Swiss archaeologist Ferdinand Keller published his findings in 1868 in his influential first report on the Swiss pile dwellings (Pfahlbaubericht). In 1863 he interpreted the remains as a Celtic village built on piles. Eduard Desor, a geologist from Neuchâtel, started excavations on the lakeshore soon afterwards. He interpreted the site as an armory, erected on platforms on piles over the lake and later destroyed by enemy action. Another interpretation accounting for the presence of cast iron swords that had not been sharpened, was of a site for ritual depositions.

With the first systematic lowering of the Swiss lakes from 1868 to 1883, the site fell completely dry. In 1880, Emile Vouga, a teacher from Marin-Epagnier, uncovered the wooden remains of two bridges (designated "Pont Desor" and "Pont Vouga") originally over 100 m (330 ft) long, that crossed the little Thielle River (today a nature reserve) and the remains of five houses on the shore. After Vouga had finished, F. Borel, curator of the Marin museum, began to excavate as well. In 1885 the canton asked the Société d'Histoire of Neuchâtel to continue the excavations, the results of which were published by Vouga in the same year.

All in all, over 2500 objects, mainly made from metal, have been excavated in La Tène. Weapons predominate, there being 166 swords (most without traces of wear), 270 lanceheads, and 22 shield bosses, along with 385 brooches, tools, and parts of chariots. Numerous human and animal bones were found as well. The site was used from the 3rd century, with a peak of activity around 200 BC and abandonment by about 60 BC. Interpretations of the site vary. Some scholars believe the bridge was destroyed by high water, while others see it as a place of sacrifice after a successful battle (there are almost no female ornaments).

An exhibition marking the 150th anniversary of the discovery of the La Tène site opened in 2007 at the Musée Schwab in Biel/Bienne, Switzerland, then Zürich in 2008 and Mont Beuvray in Burgundy in 2009.

== Sites ==
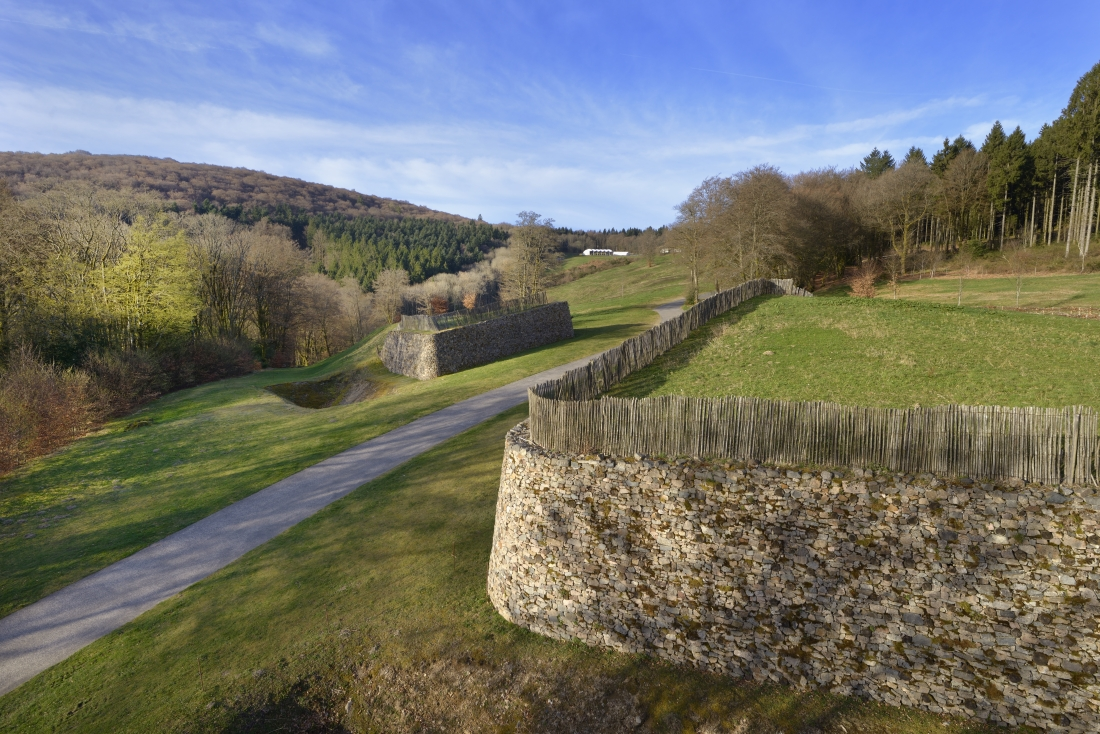
Partly reconstructed fortification walls at the oppidum of Bibracte, central France

Some sites are:

- Altburg oppidum, Germany
- Bern, Engehalbinsel oppidum
- Jolimont
- Manching: oppidum
- Ehrenbürg hillfort
- Mormont
- Oppidum of Moulay
- Münsingen, burial field
- Petinesca
- Basel oppidum
- Bibracte, oppidum of the Aedui at Mont Beuvray in Burgundy
- Erstfeld hoard
- Turicum–Lindenhof
- Bopfingen: Viereckschanze, a characteristic rectangular enclosure
- Fellbach-Schmiden, near Stuttgart: Viereckschanze; ritual objects recovered from a well
- Rodenbach: The Princely Grave of Rodenbach
- Havranok, Slovakia
- Reisberg oppidum
- Gondole oppidum
- Kleinaspergle: elite graves of La Tène I
- Waldalgesheim chariot burial: an elite chariot burial, 4th century
- Glauberg, oppidum and elite graves
- Dürrnberg near Hallein: Burial field and earthworks of late Hallstatt–early La Tène
- Donnersberg oppidum
- Steinsburg oppidum
- Vill near Innsbruck: remains of dwellings
- Sandberg Celtic city near Platt and Roseldorf in Lower Austria
- Vix/Mont Lassois: oppidum and elaborate graves
- Titelberg: oppidum in Luxembourg
- Reinheim: Tomb of a princess/priestess with burial gifts
- Mihailovac: in Serbia
- Závist oppidum, Czech Republic
- Stradonice oppidum, Czech Republic
- Dünsberg hillfort, Germany
- Schwarzenbach oppidum, Austria
- Houbirg oppidum

=== Gallery ===
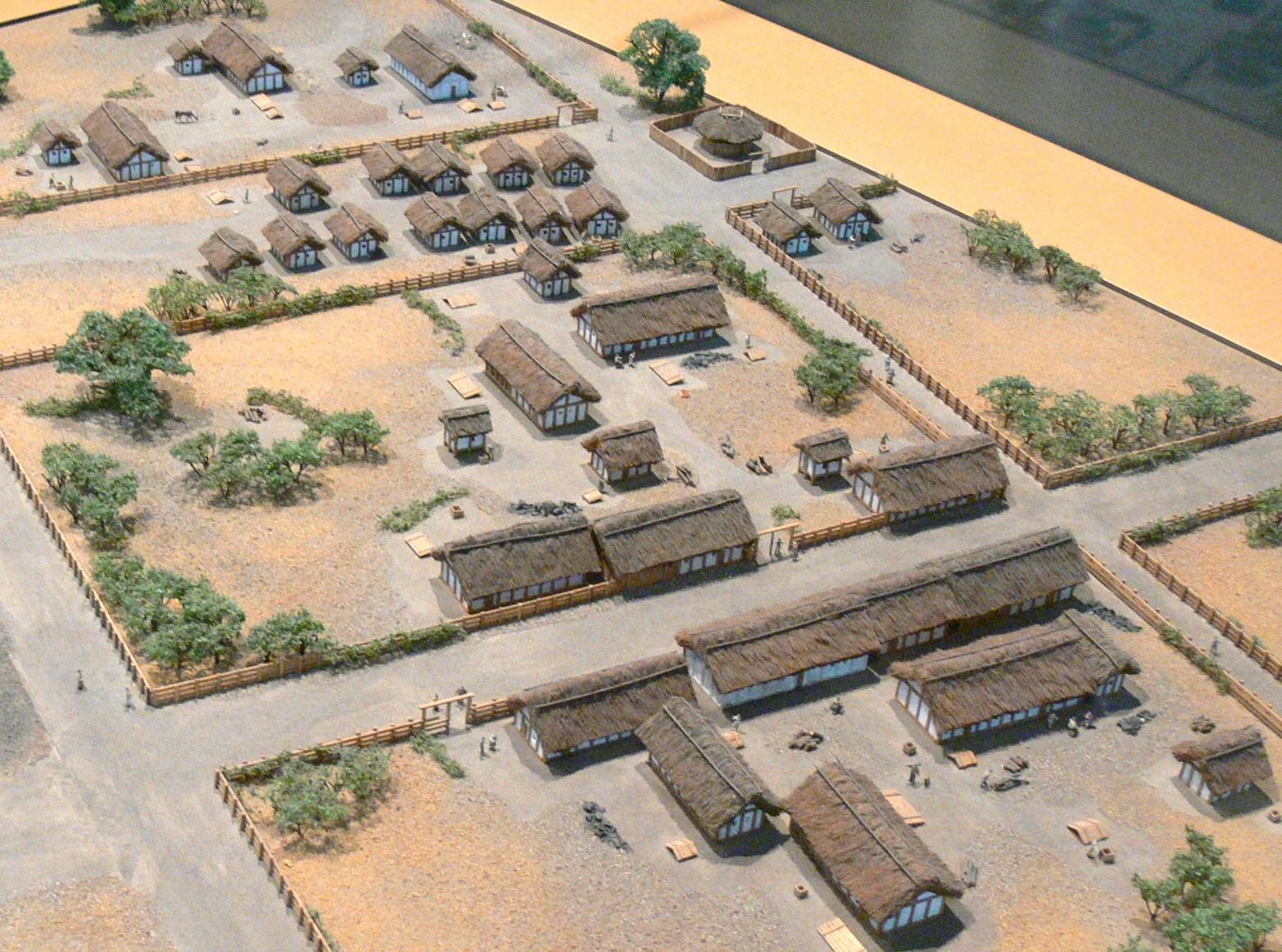
Part of the Oppidum of Manching, Germany

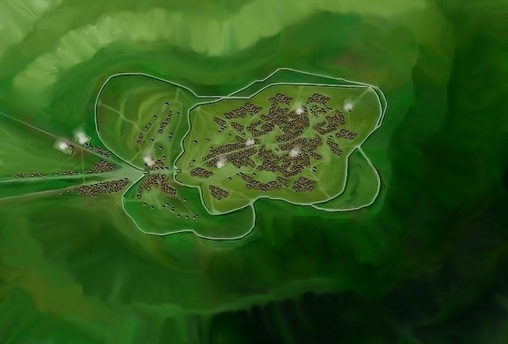
Bibracte oppidum, France

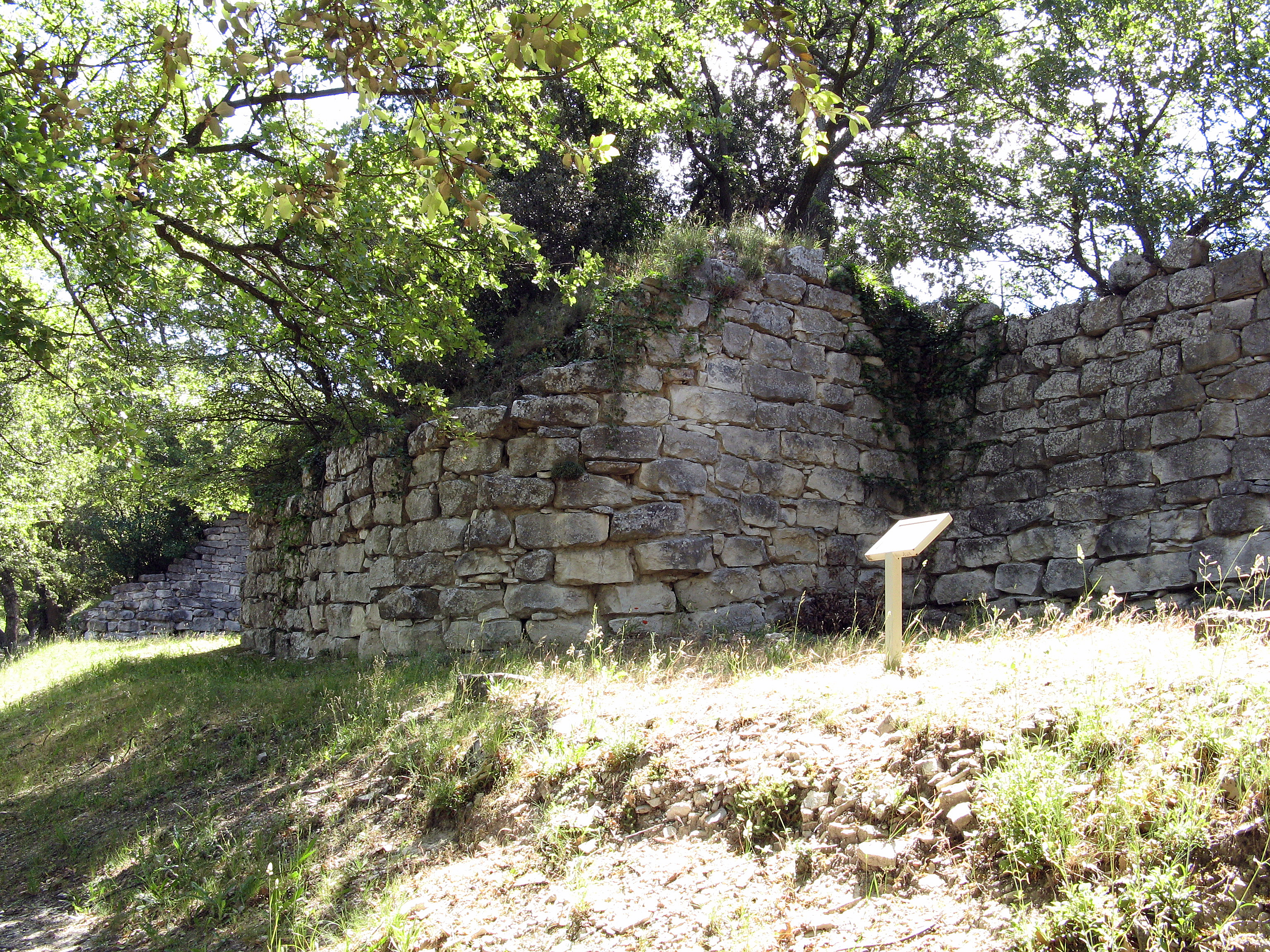
Fortification wall, Entremont oppidum

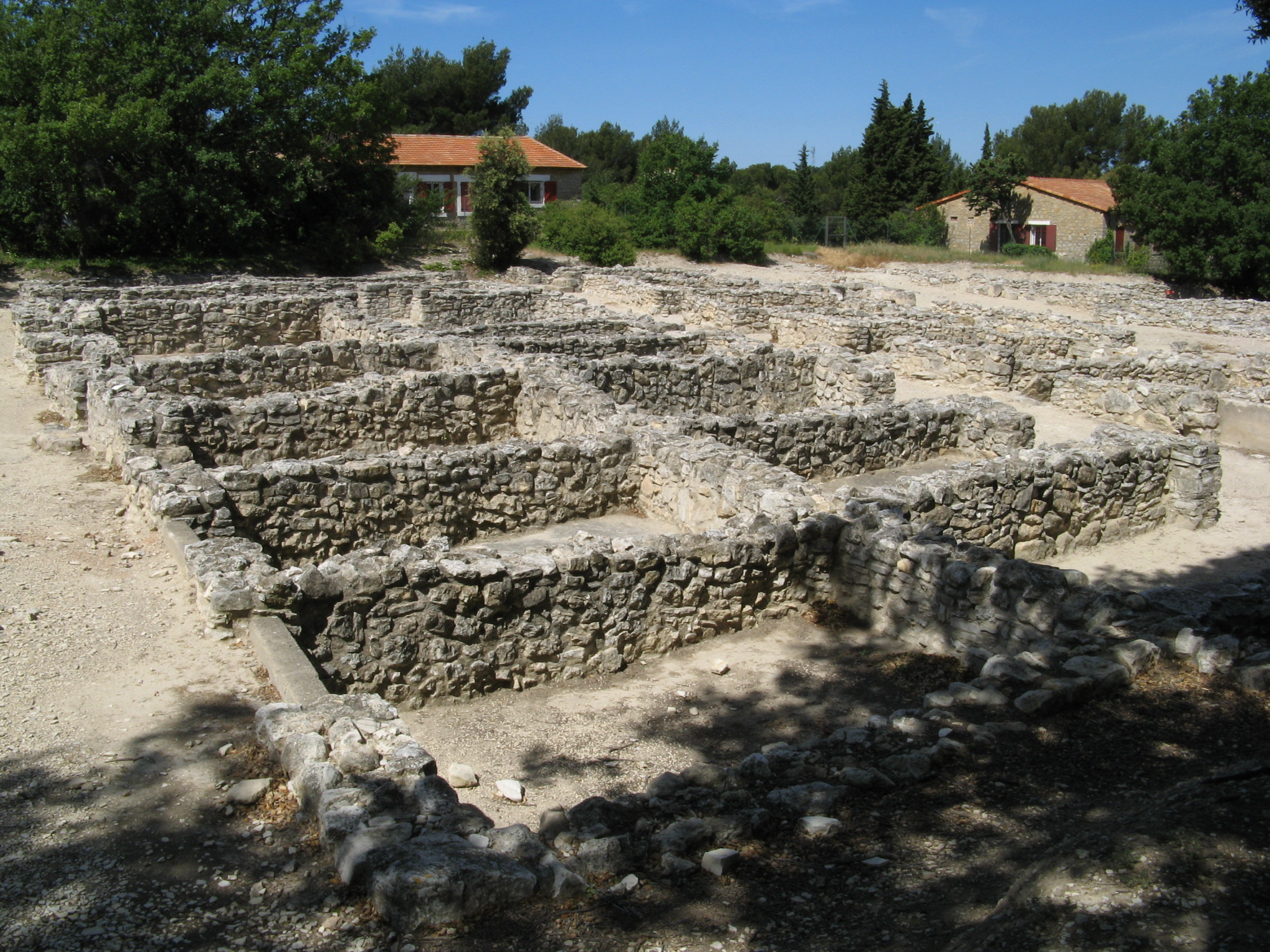
Entremont oppidum remains, France

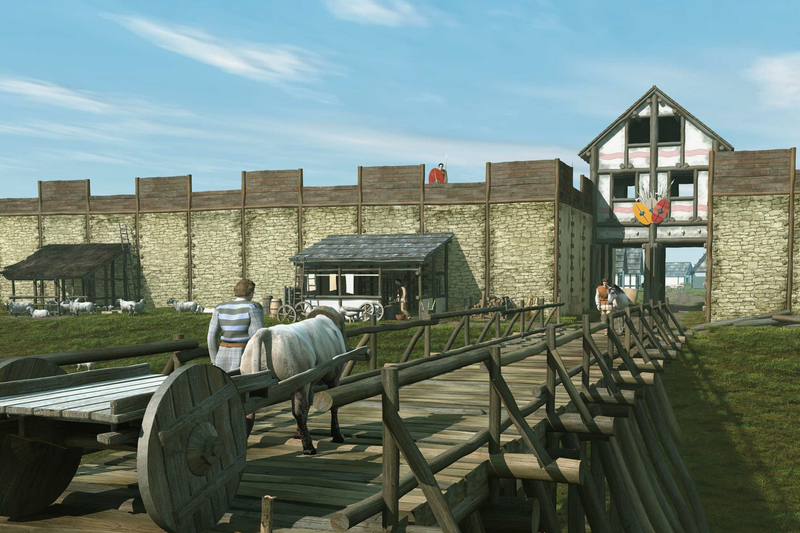
Oppidum of Basel, Switzerland

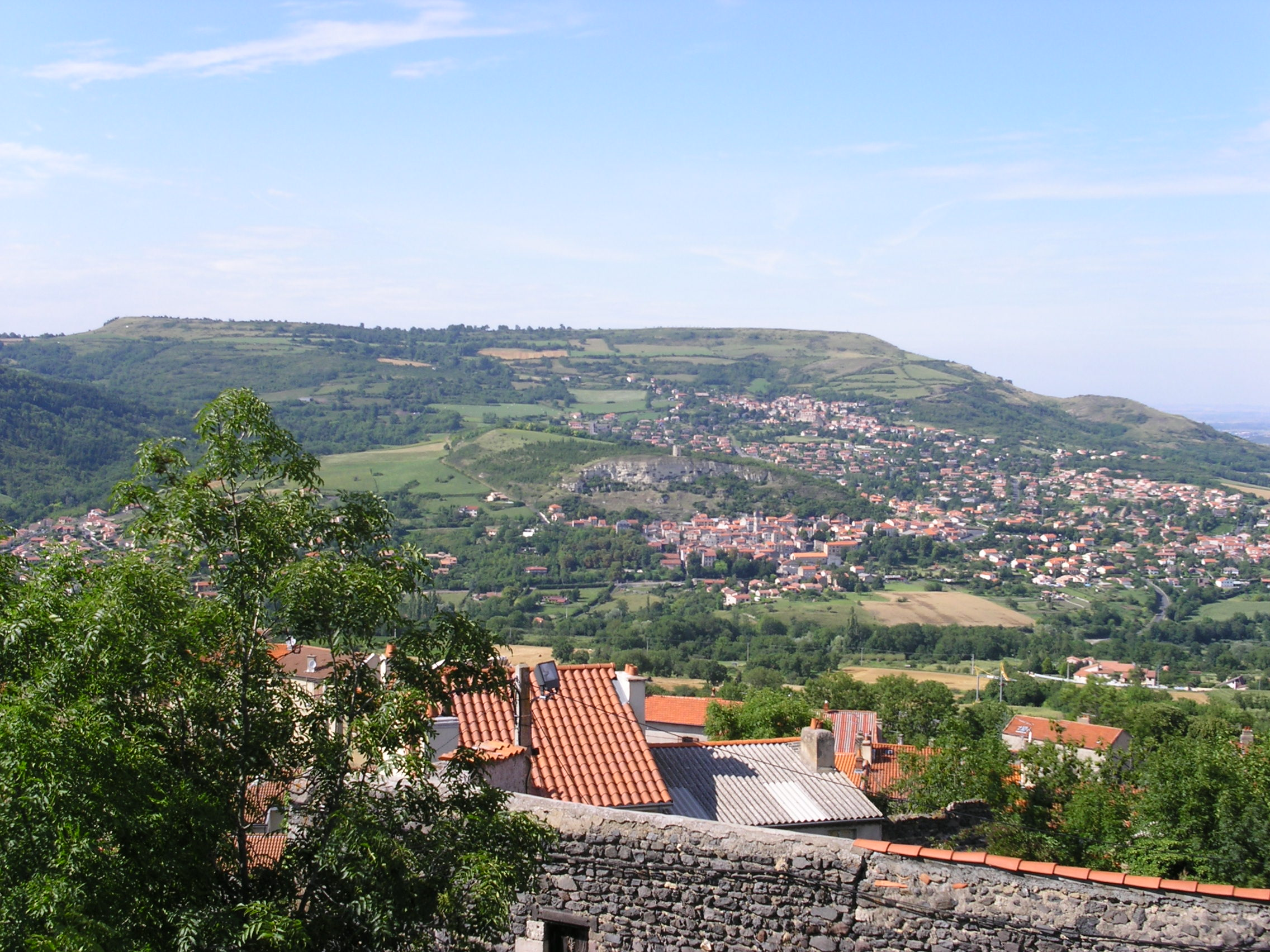
View of the plateau of Gergovia, France

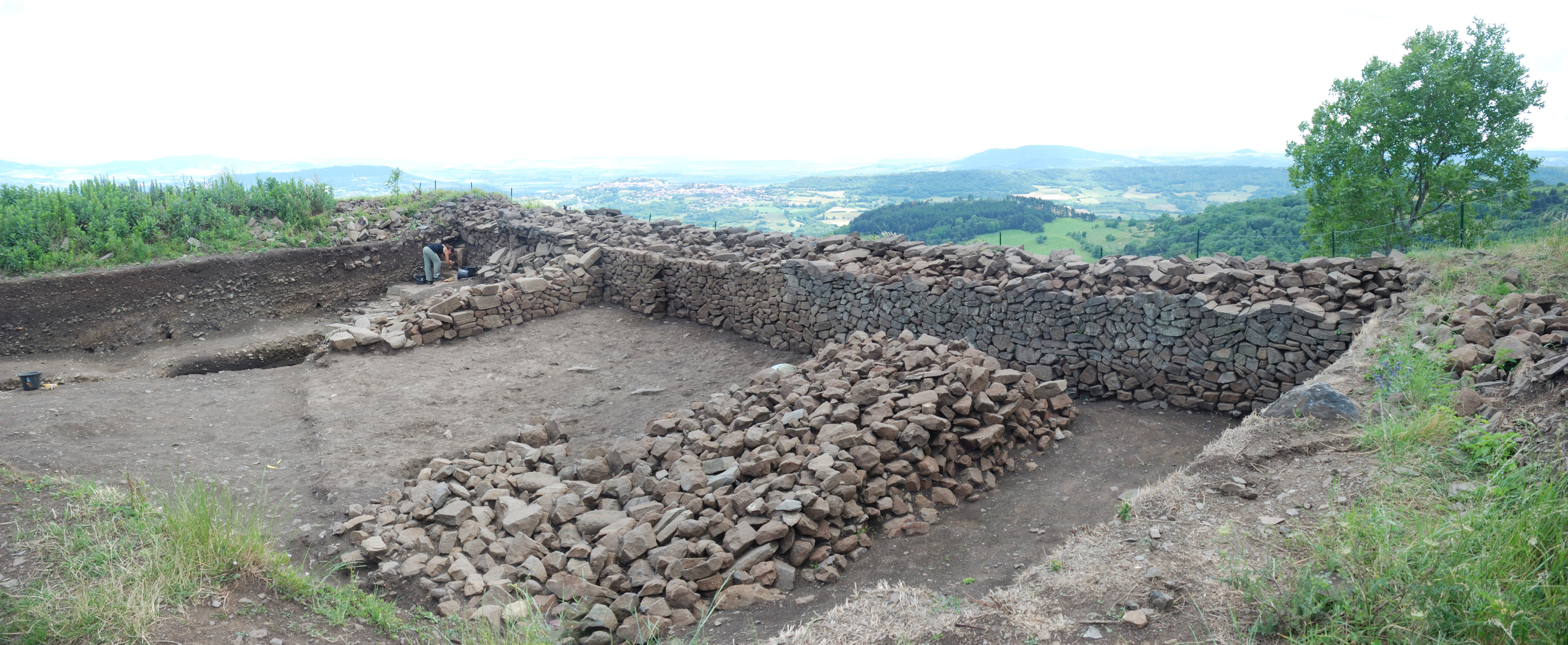
Wall remains at Gergovia, France

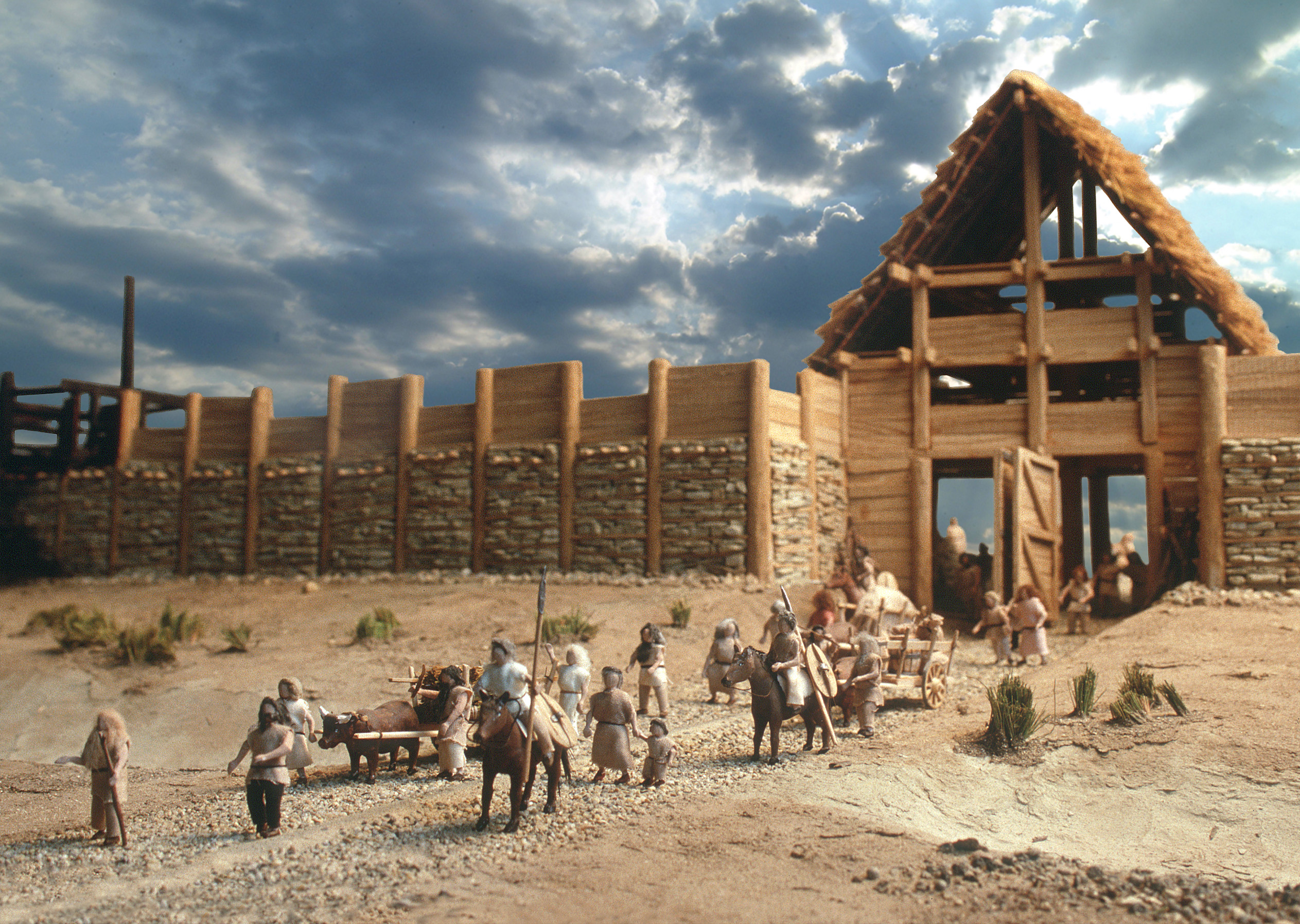
Mont Vully oppidum, Switzerland

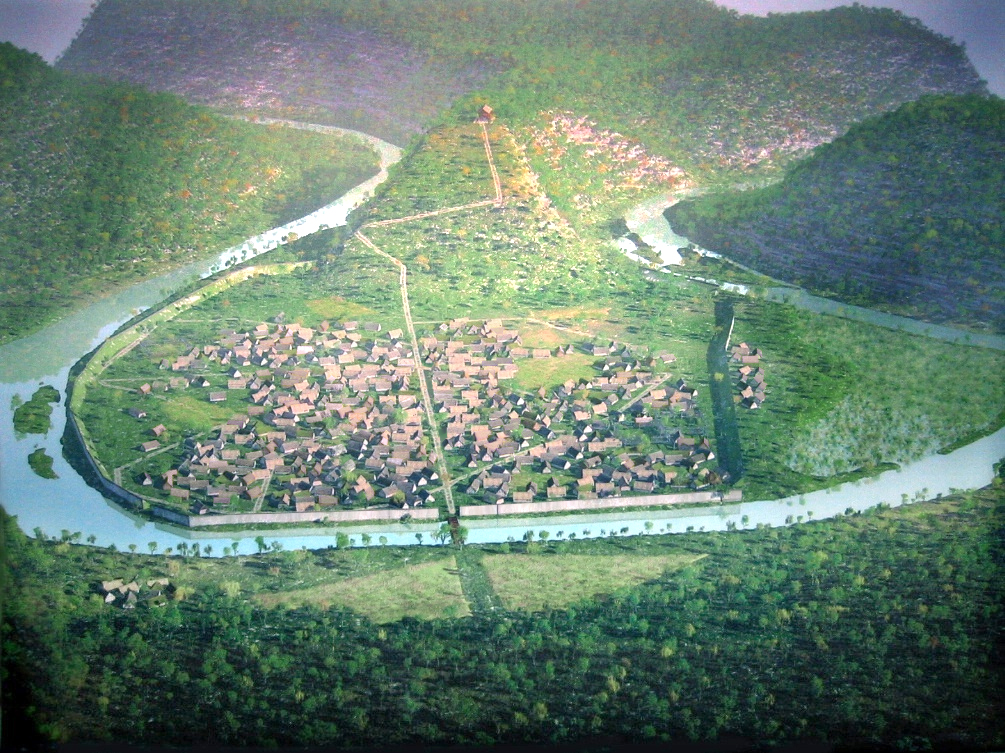
Vesontio oppidum, France

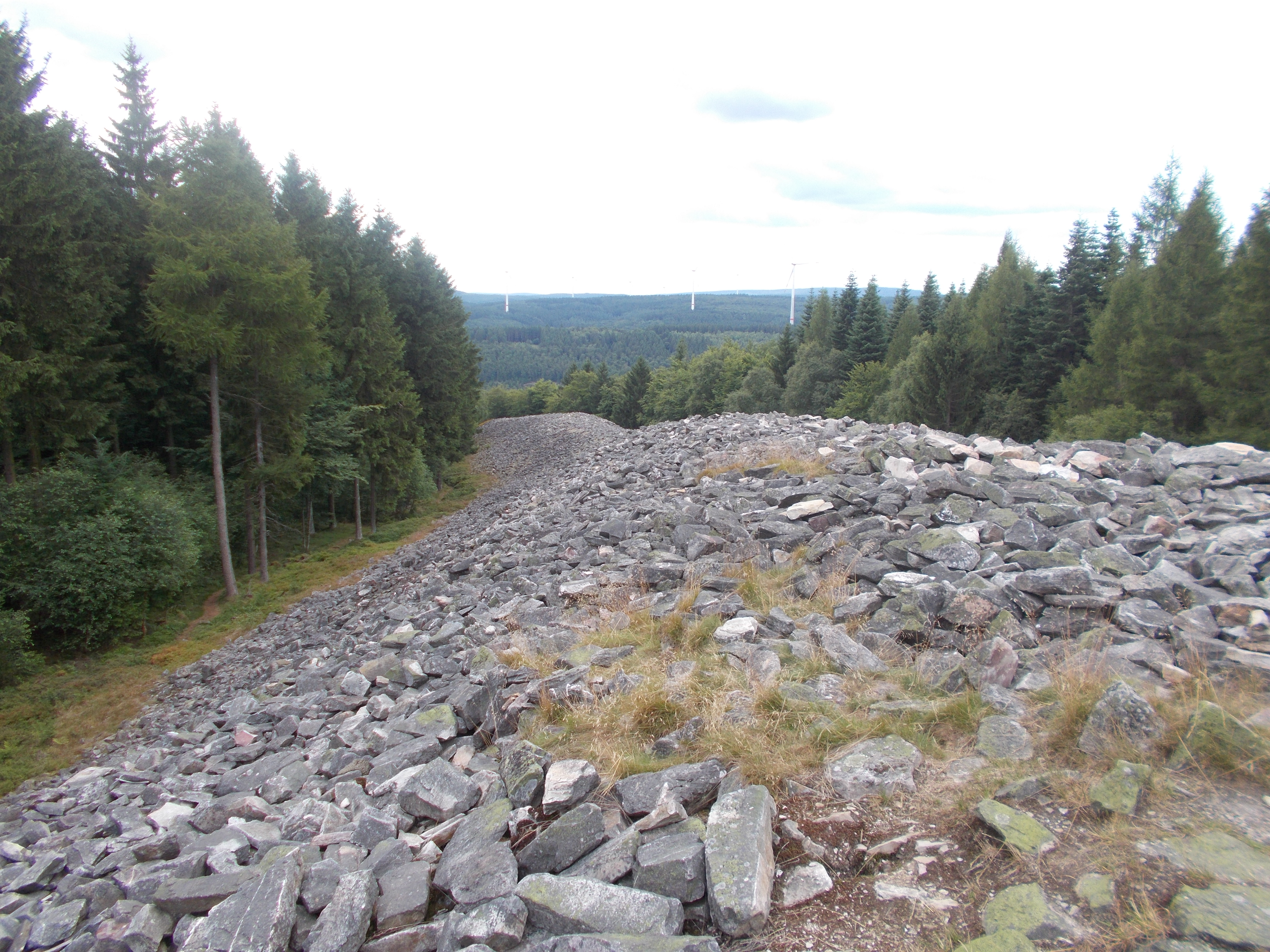
Otzenhausen hillfort wall remains, Germany

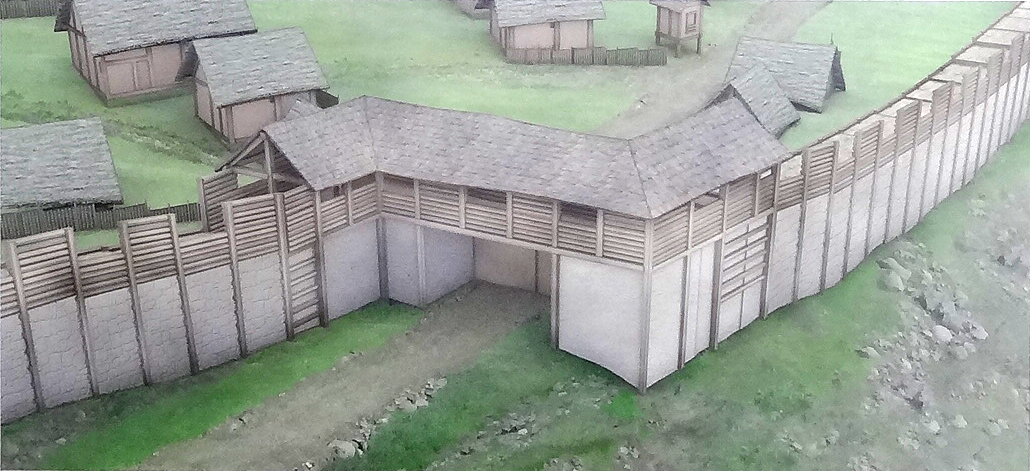
Glauberg oppidum, Germany

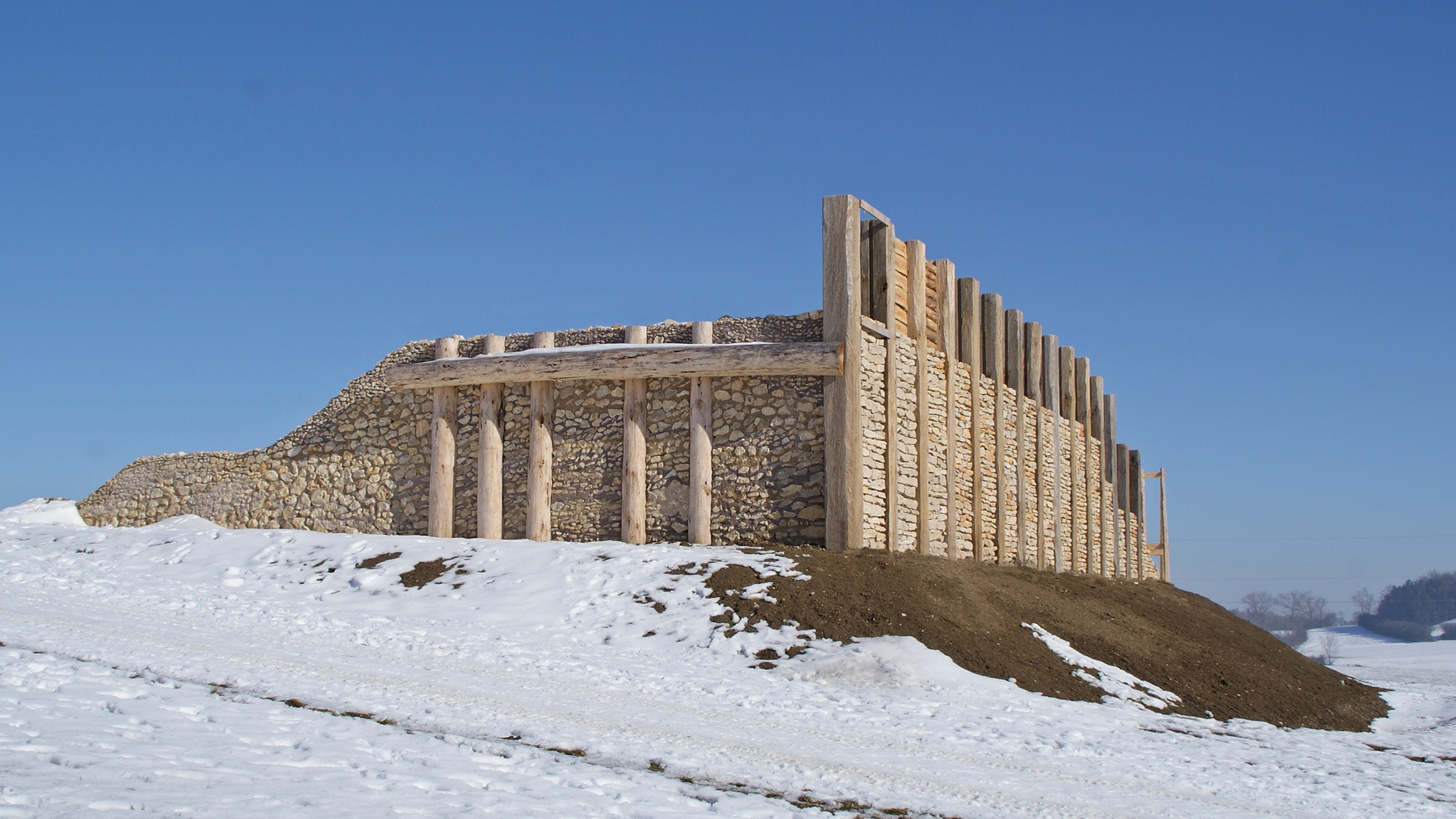
Fortifications at Ipf hillfort, Germany

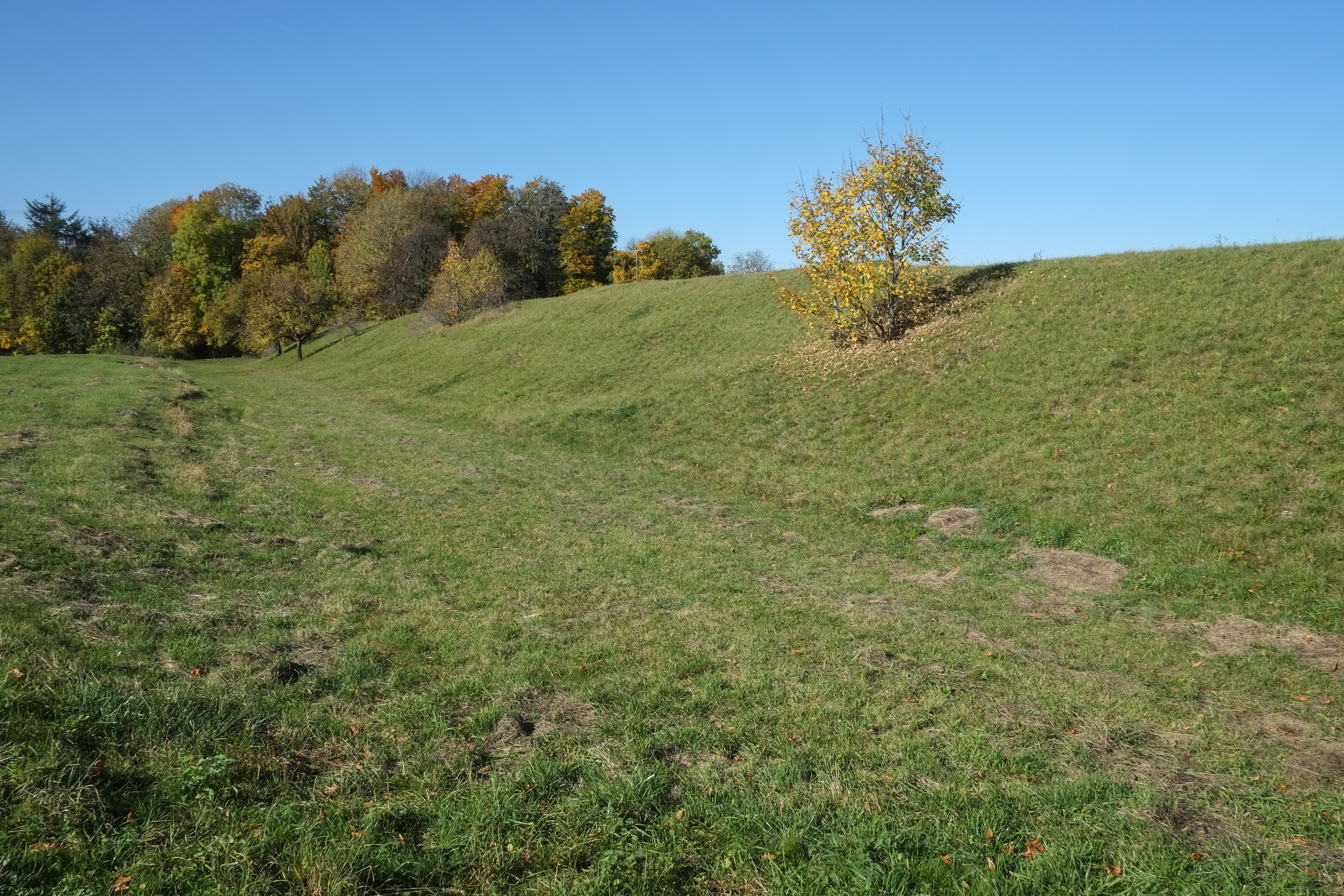
Heidengraben oppidum ramparts, Germany.

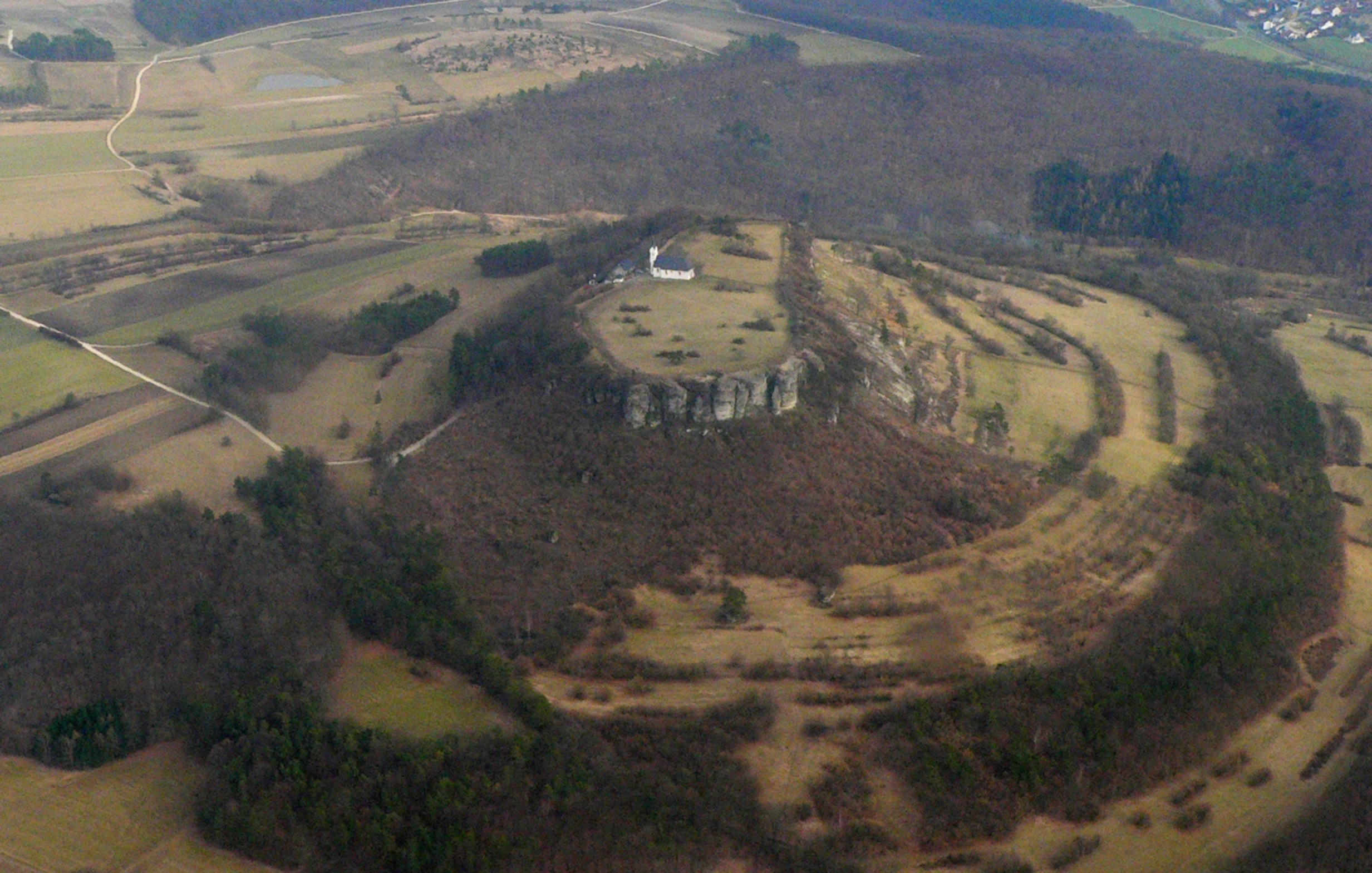
Site of the Staffelberg oppidum, Germany

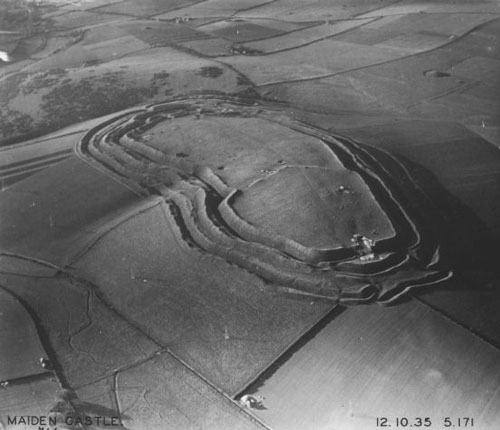
Maiden Castle hillfort, Britain

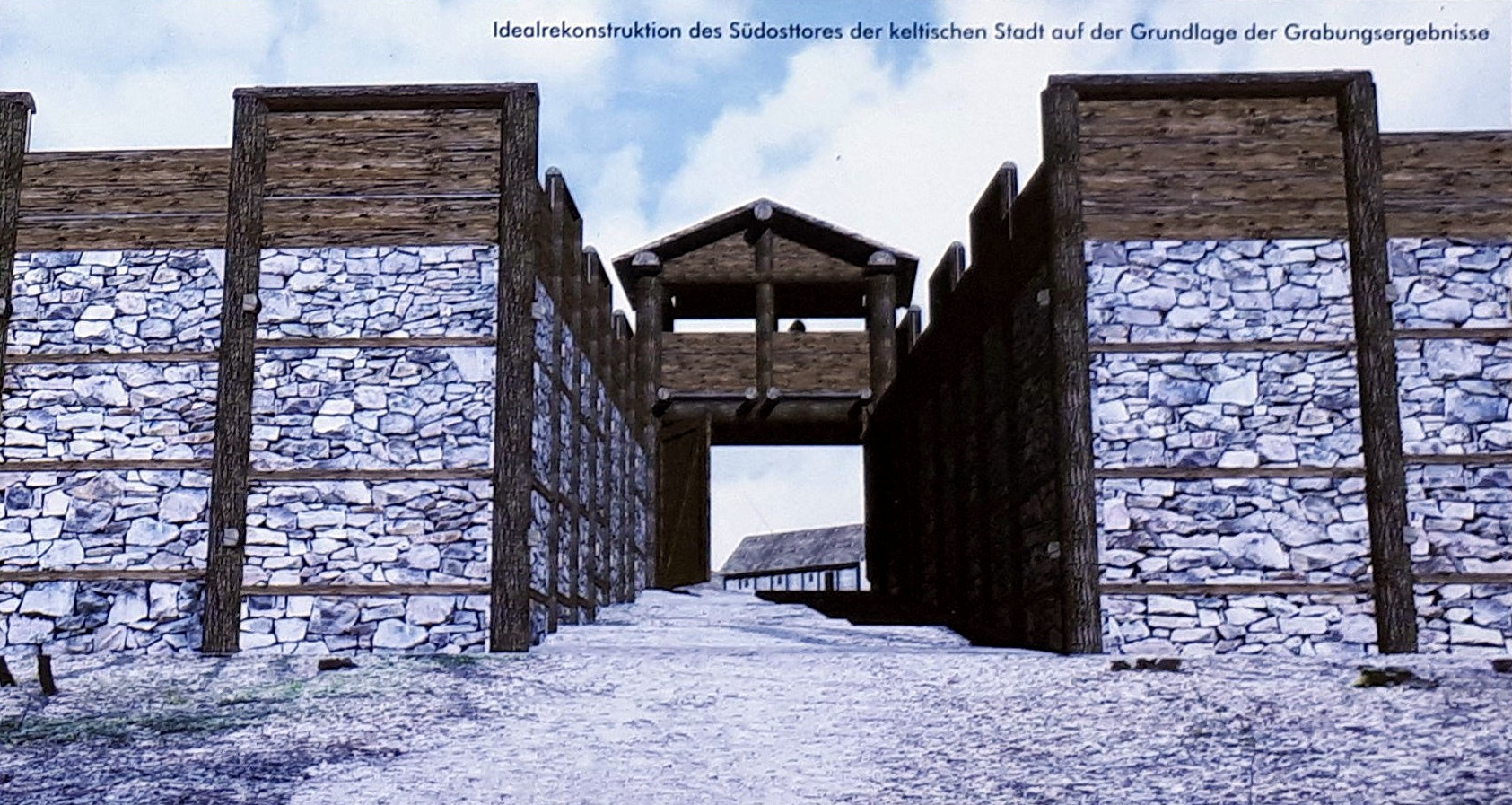
Donnersberg hillfort, Germany

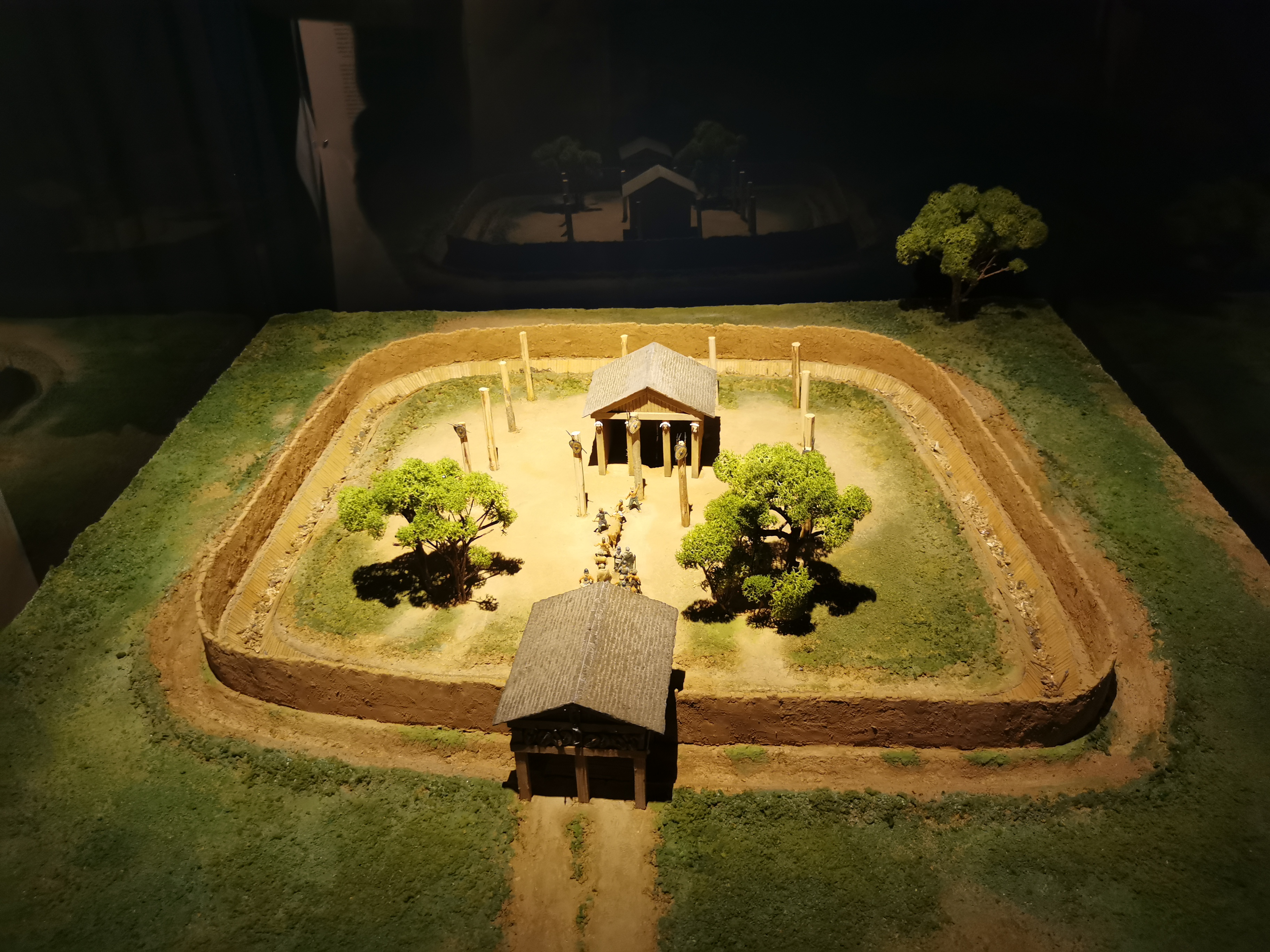
Sanctuary of Gournay-sur-Aronde, France

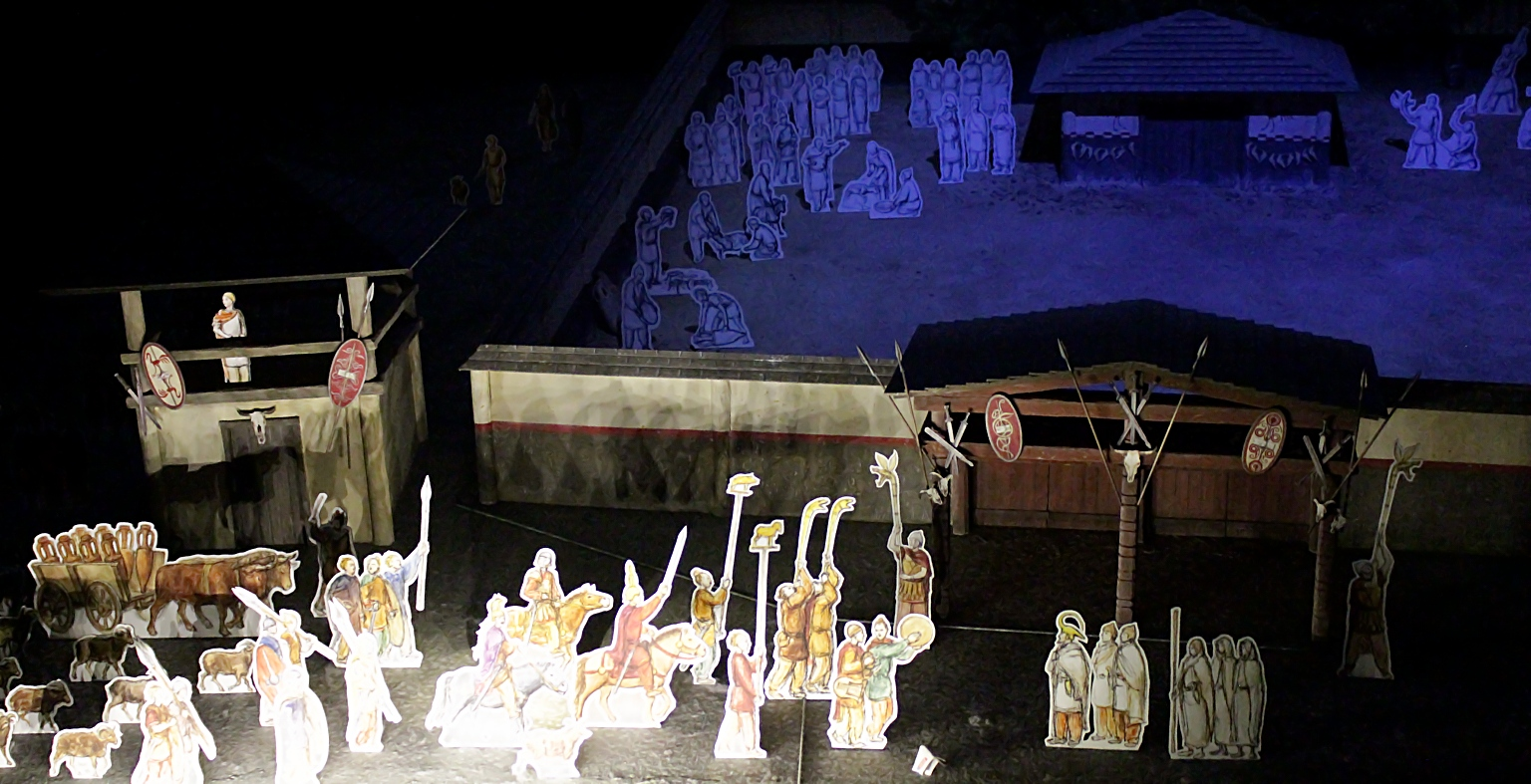
Tintignac sanctuary, France

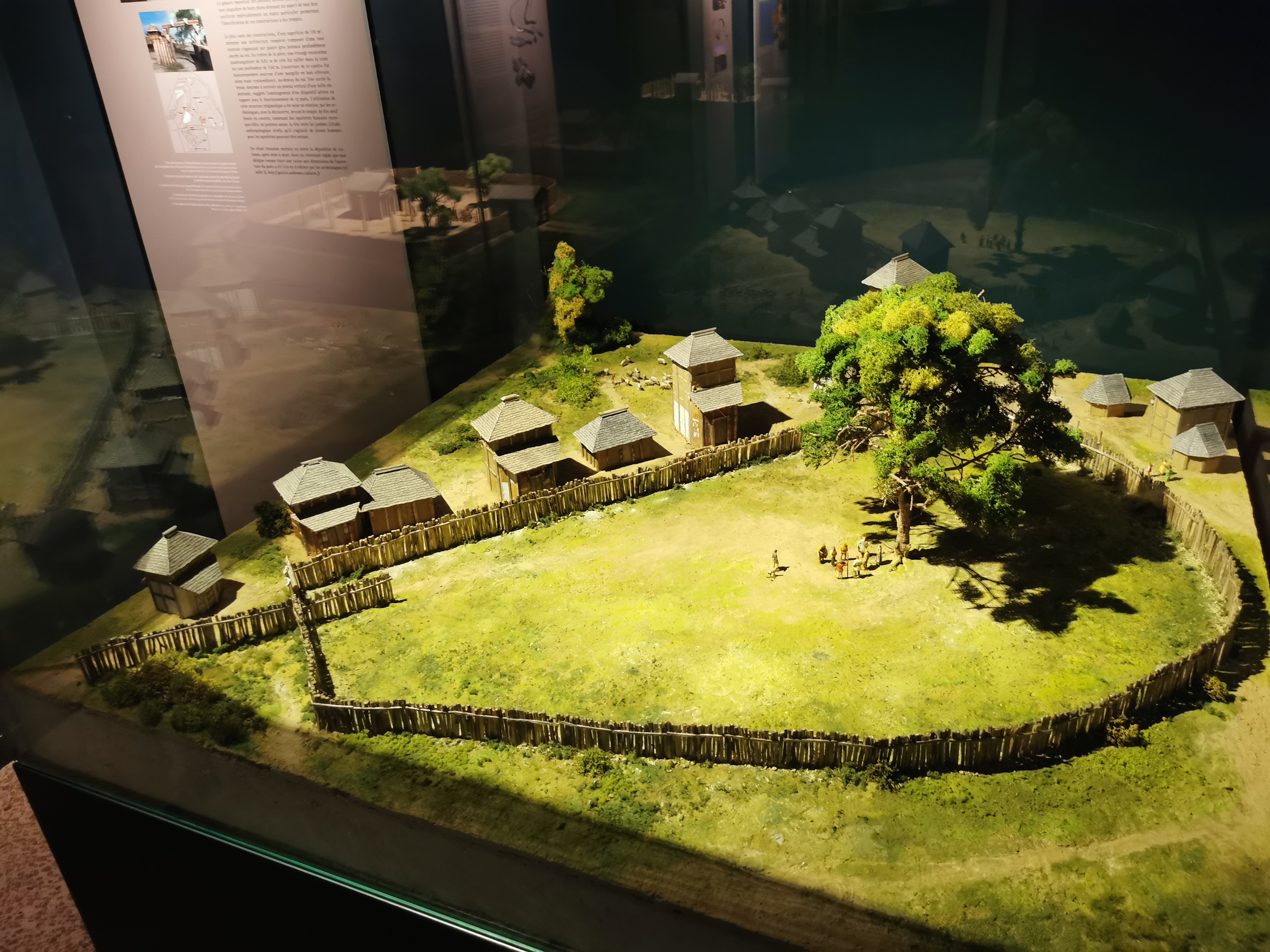
Temple buildings at Acy-Romance, France

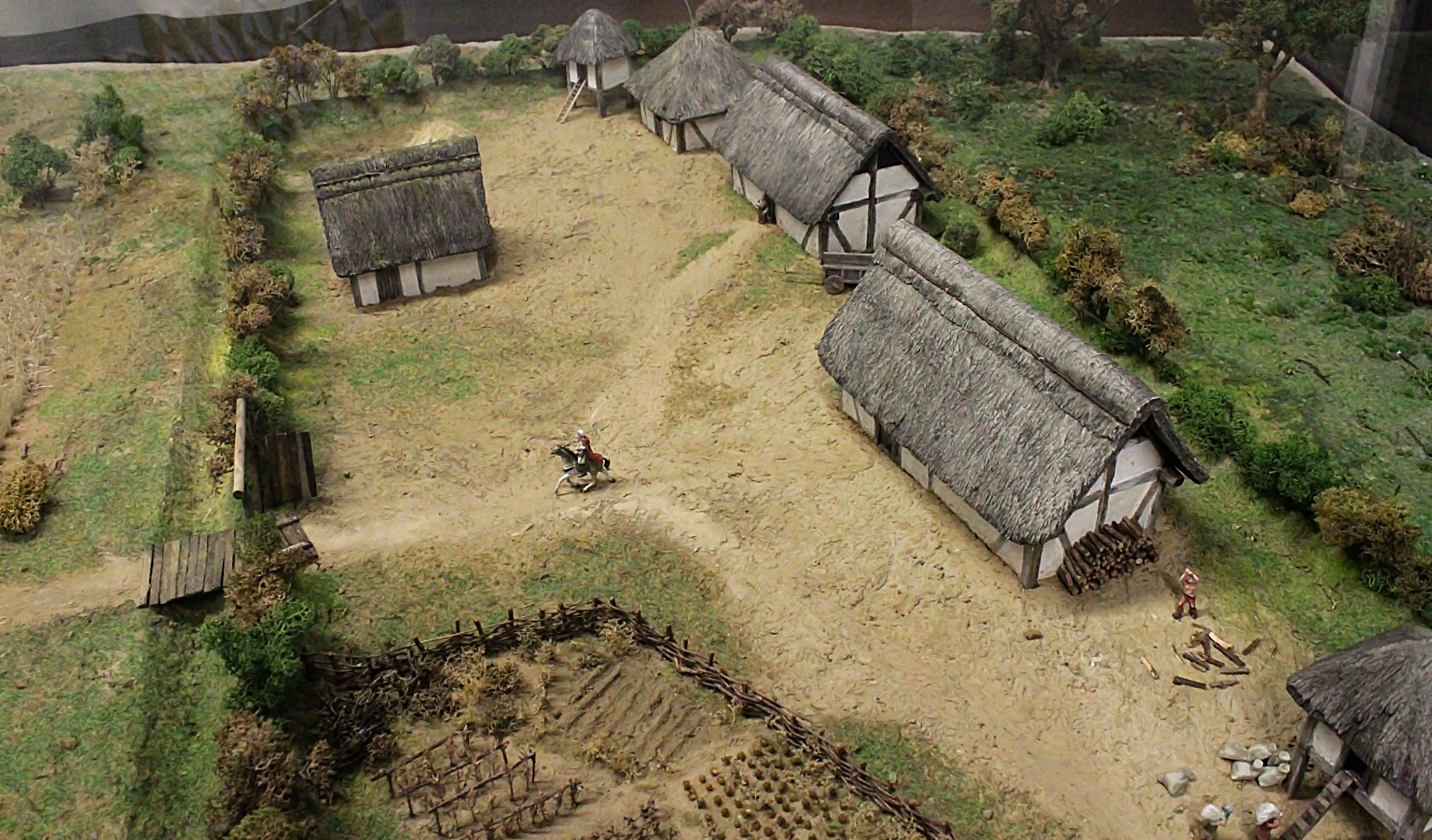
Gallic farm at Verberie, France

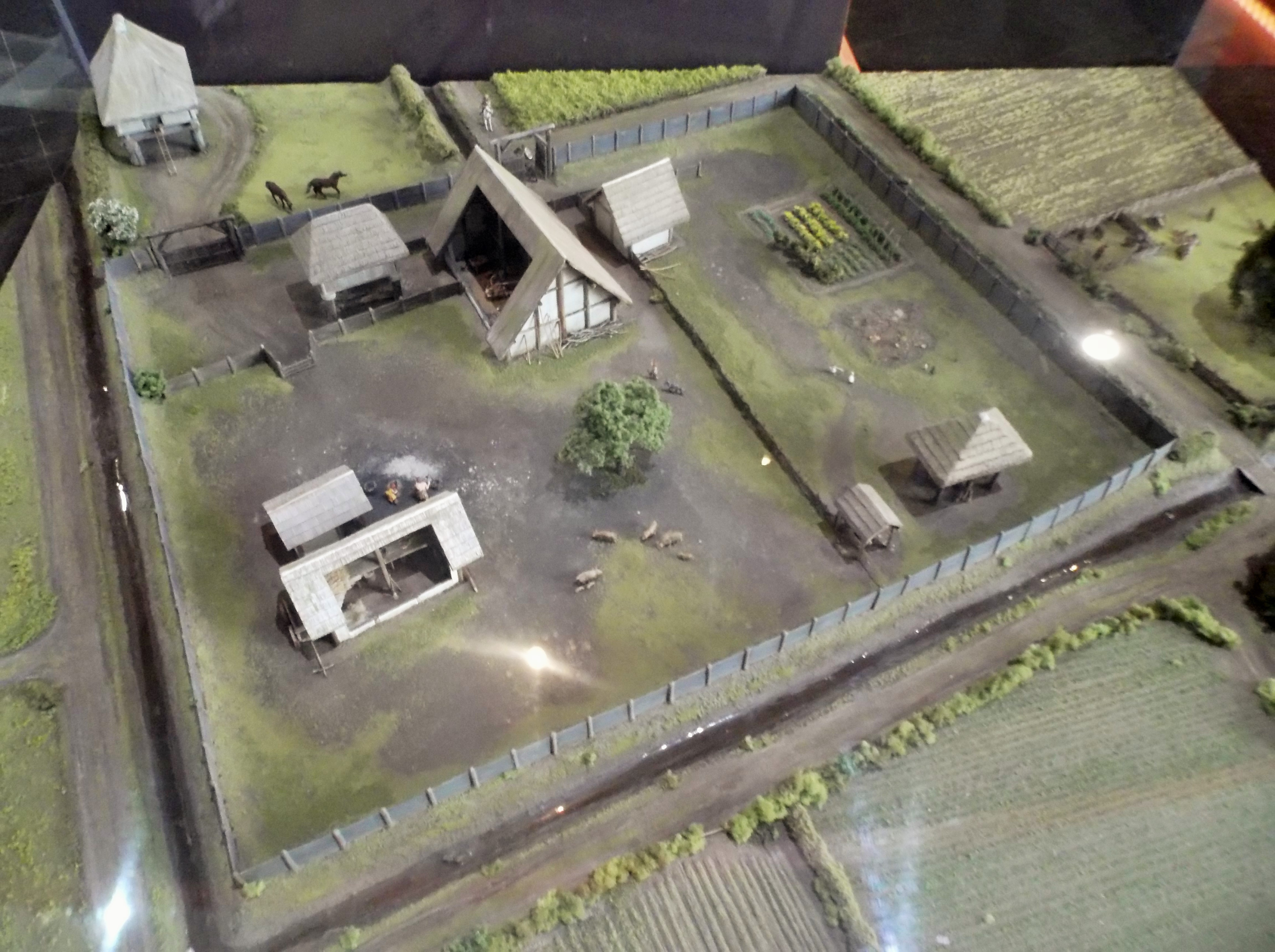
Gallic farm at Le Patural, France

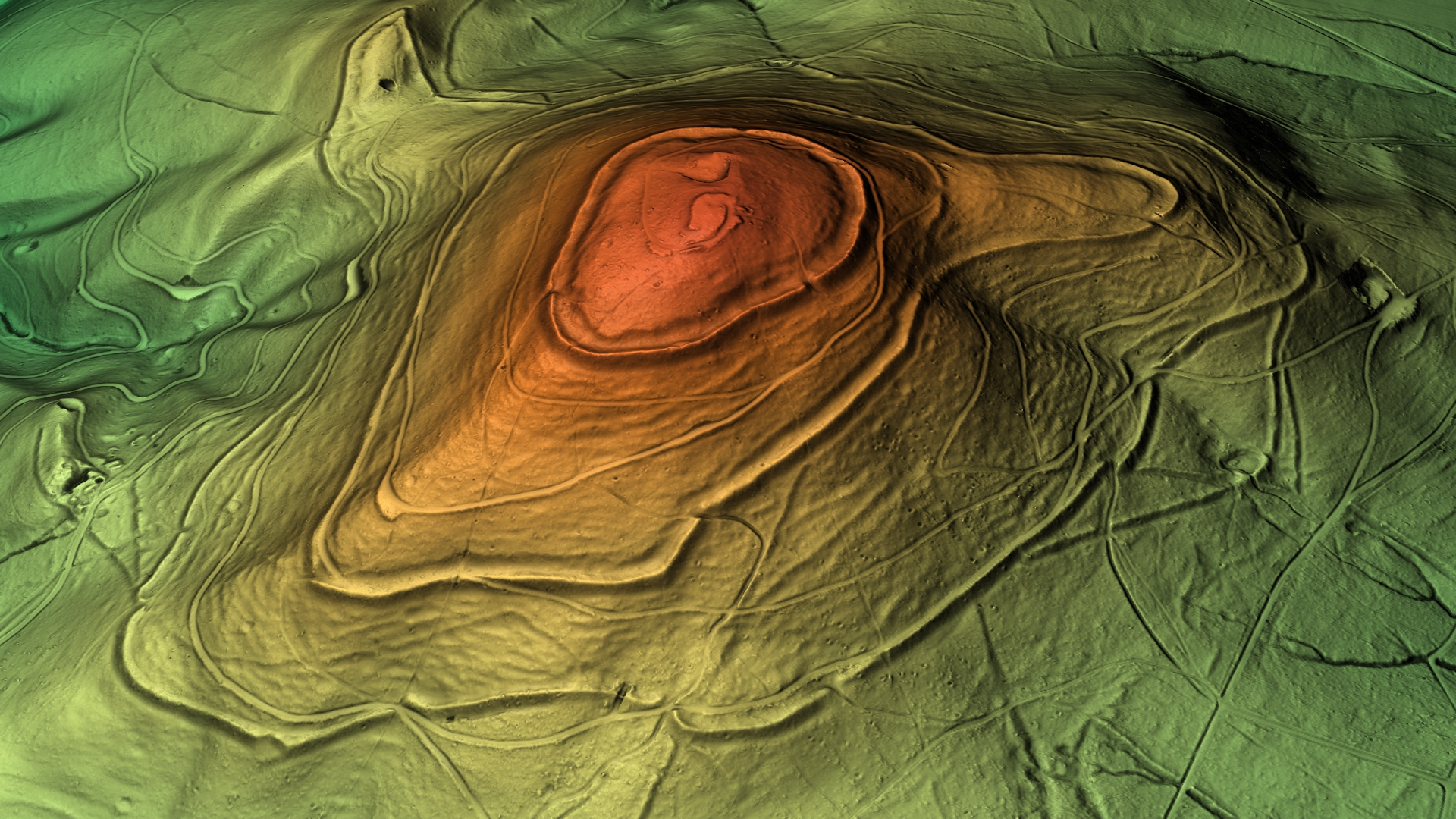
Dünsberg oppidum, Germany

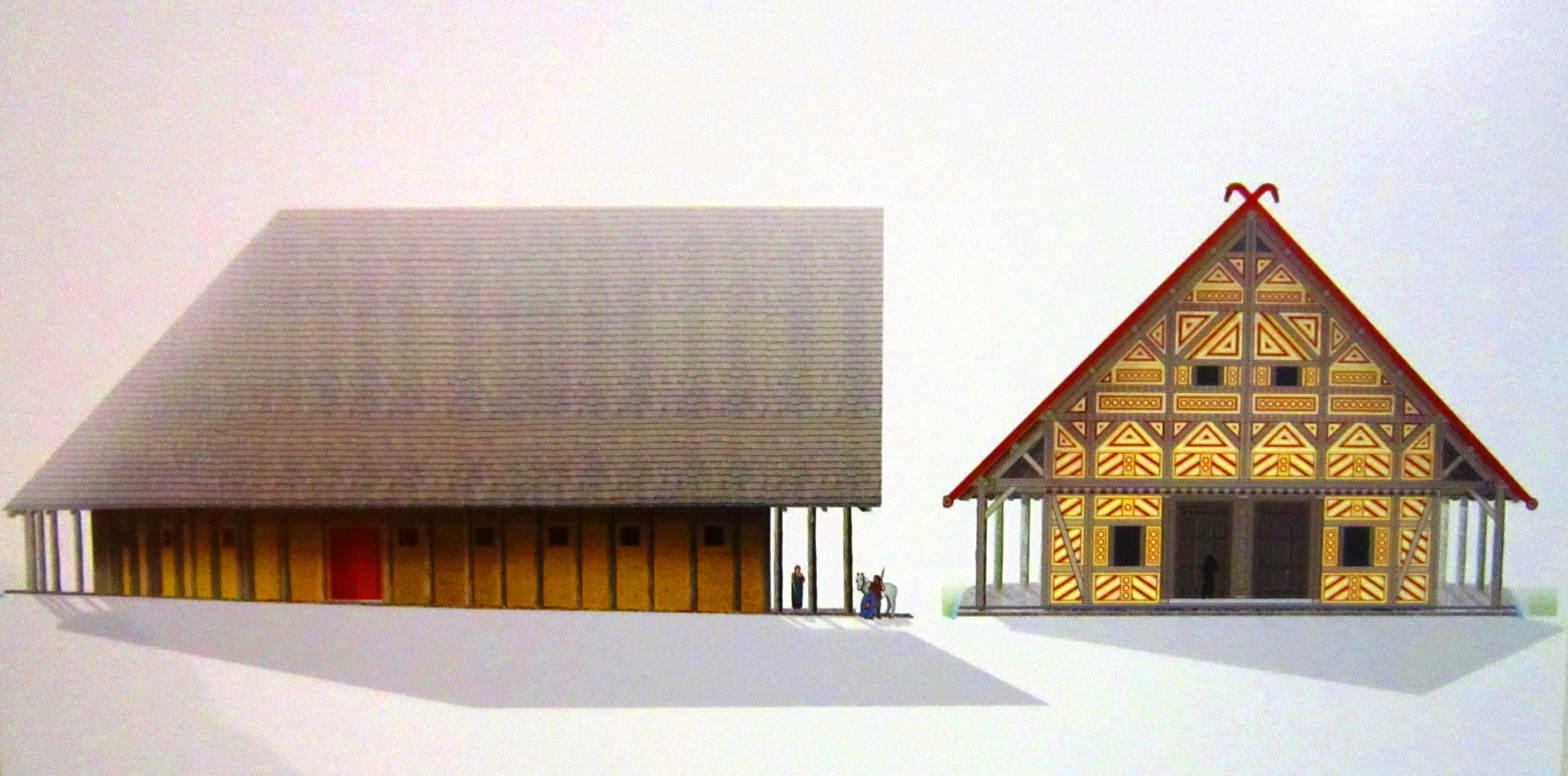
Vix palace, France

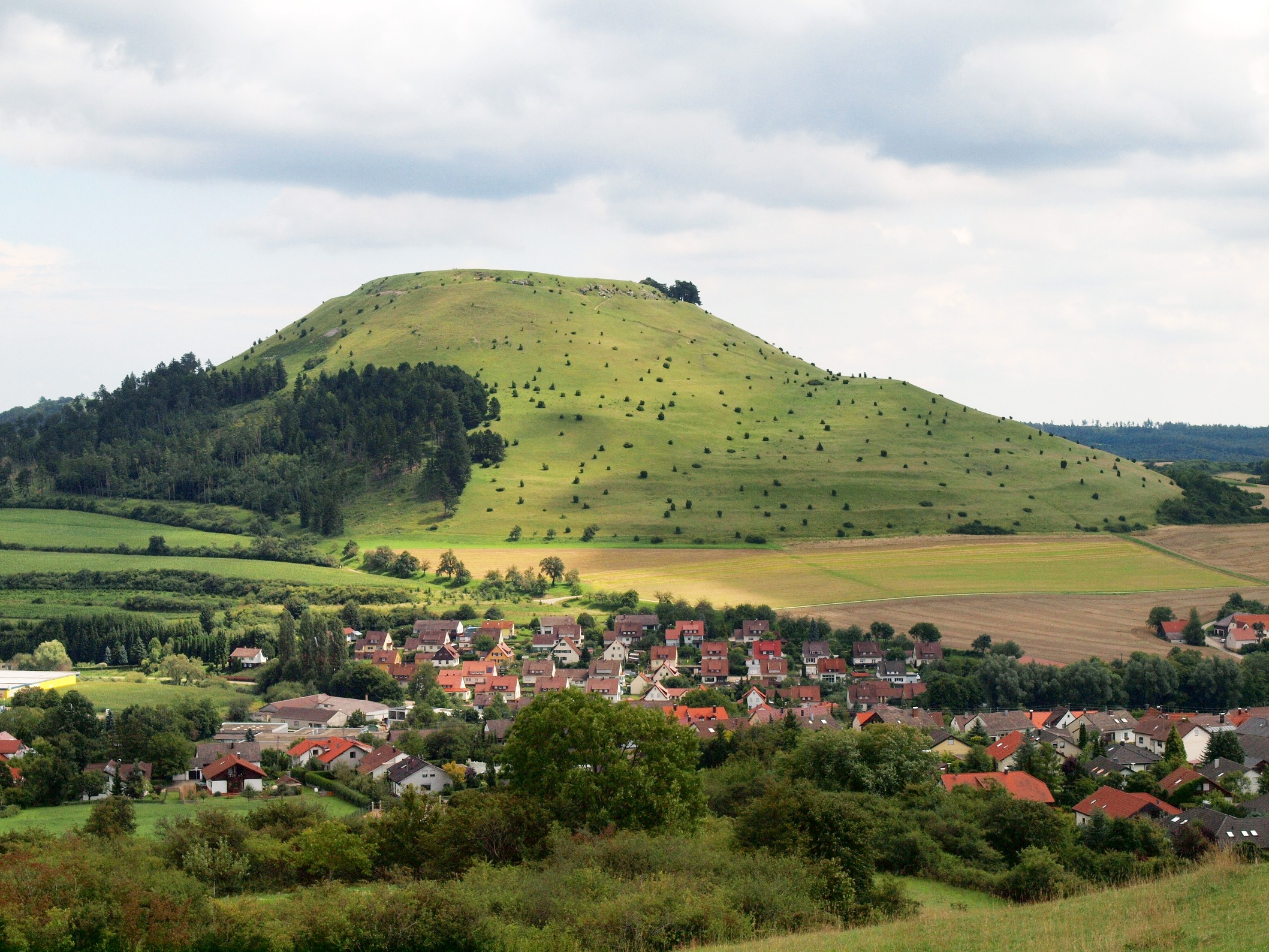
The Ipf hillfort in southern Germany

== Artifacts ==
Some outstanding La Tène artifacts are:

- Mšecké Žehrovice Head, a stone head from the modern Czech Republic
- A life-sized sculpture of a warrior that stood above the Glauberg burials
- Chariot burial found at La Gorge Meillet (St-Germain-en-Laye: Musée des Antiquités Nationales)
- Basse Yutz Flagons 5th century
- Agris Helmet, with gold covering, c. 350
- Waldalgesheim chariot burial, Bad Kreuznach, Germany, late 4th century BCE, Rheinisches Landesmuseum Bonn; the "Waldalgesheim phase/style" of the art takes its name from the jewellery found here.
- A gold-and-bronze model of an oak tree (3rd century BCE) found at the Oppidum of Manching.
- Sculptures from Roquepertuse, a sanctuary in the south of France
- The silver Gundestrup cauldron (2nd or 1st century BCE), found ritually broken in a peat bog near Gundestrup, Denmark, but probably made near the Black Sea, perhaps in Thrace. (National Museum of Denmark, Copenhagen)
- Battersea Shield (350–50 BCE), found in London in the Thames, made of bronze with red enamel. (British Museum, London)
- Waterloo Helmet, 150–50 BCE, Thames
- "Witham Shield" (4th century BCE). (British Museum, London)
- Torrs Pony-cap and Horns, from Scotland
- Cordoba Treasure
- Turoe stone in Galway and Killycluggin Stone in Cavan Ireland
- Great Torc from Snettisham, 100–75 BCE, gold, the most elaborate of the British style of torcs
- Meyrick Helmet, post-conquest Roman helmet shape, with La Tène decoration
- Noric steel
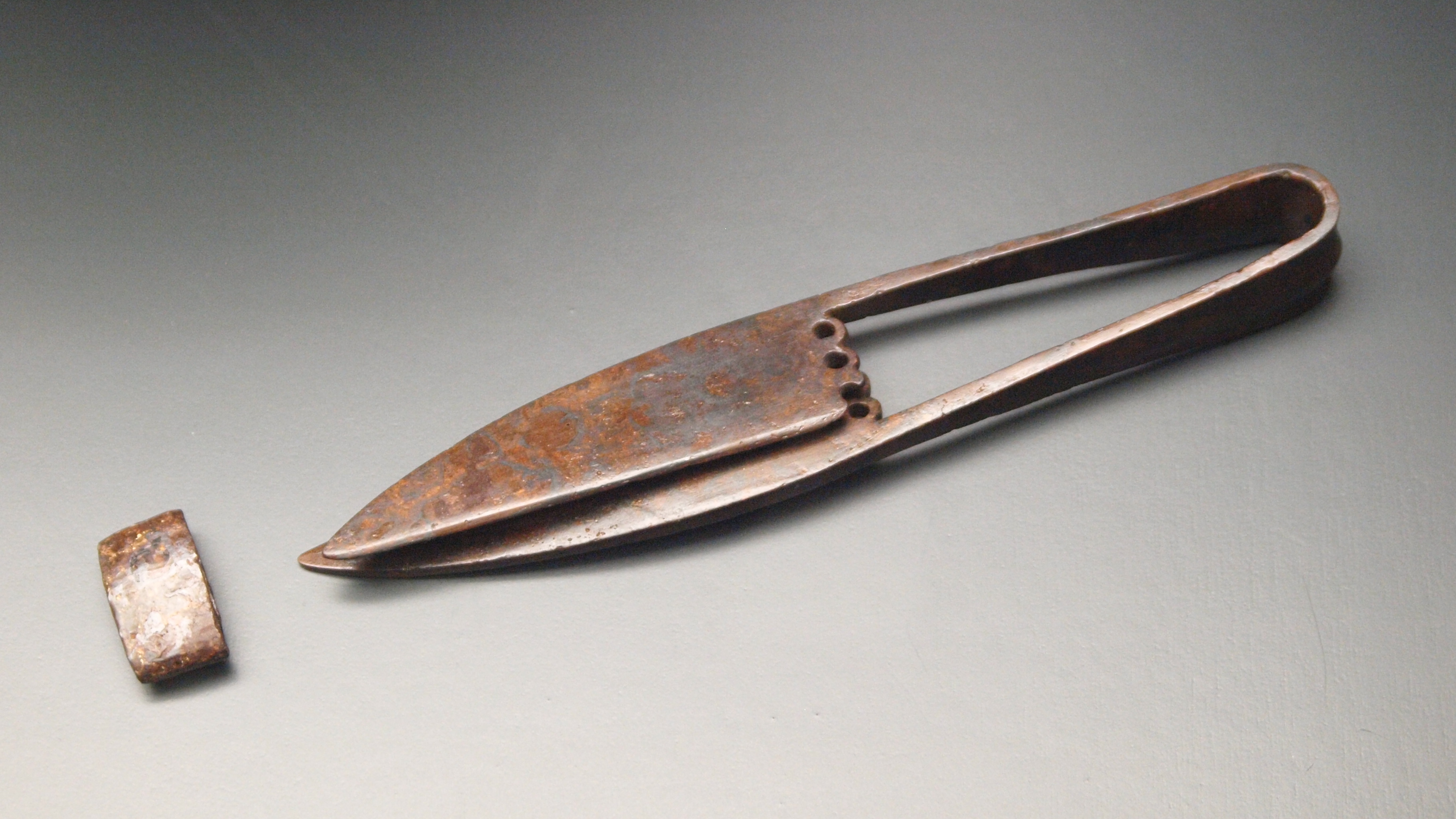
Sheep shears, found at Oppidum of Manching, Germany

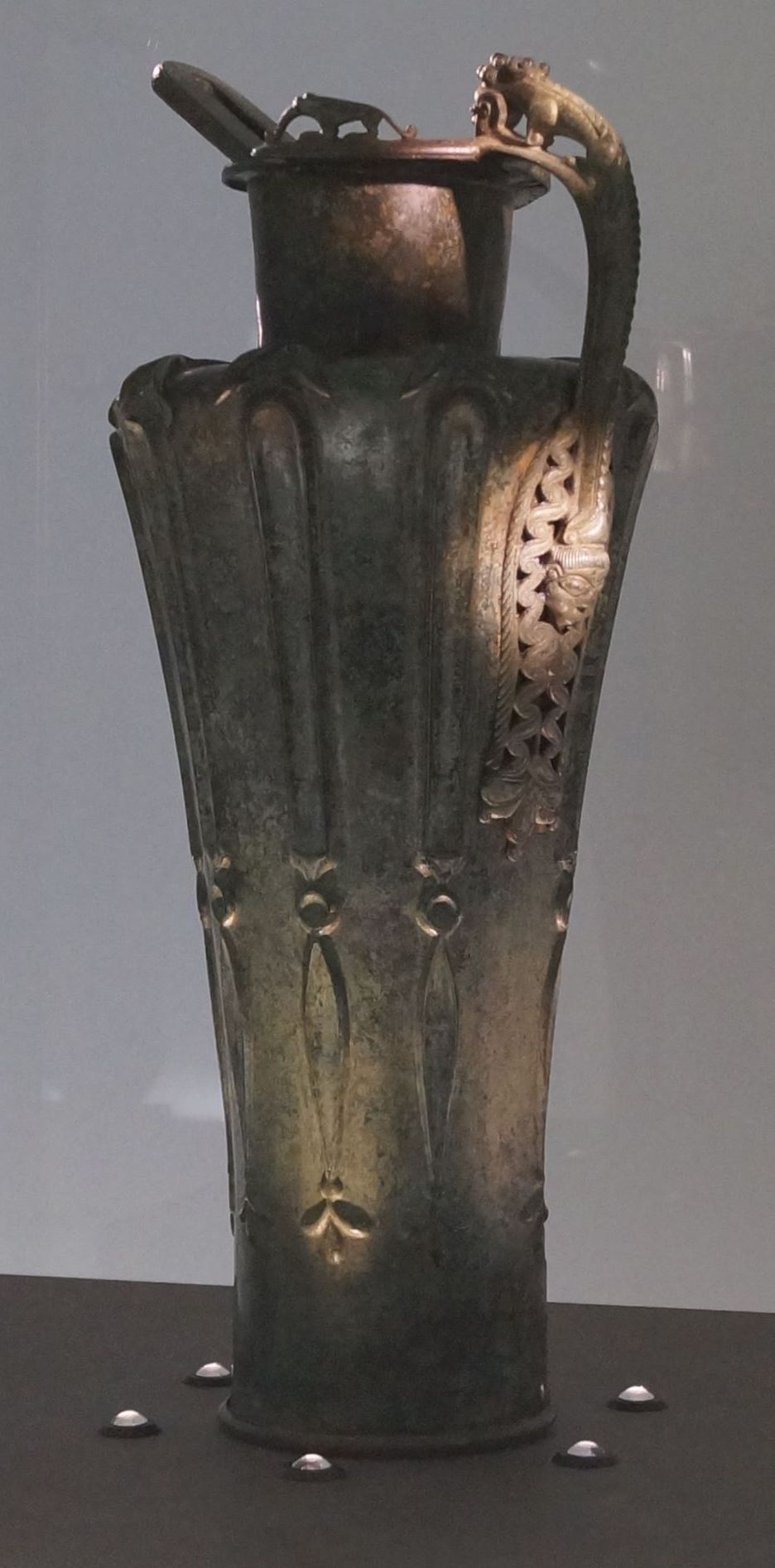
Celtic flagon from Hallein, Austria, 5th century BC

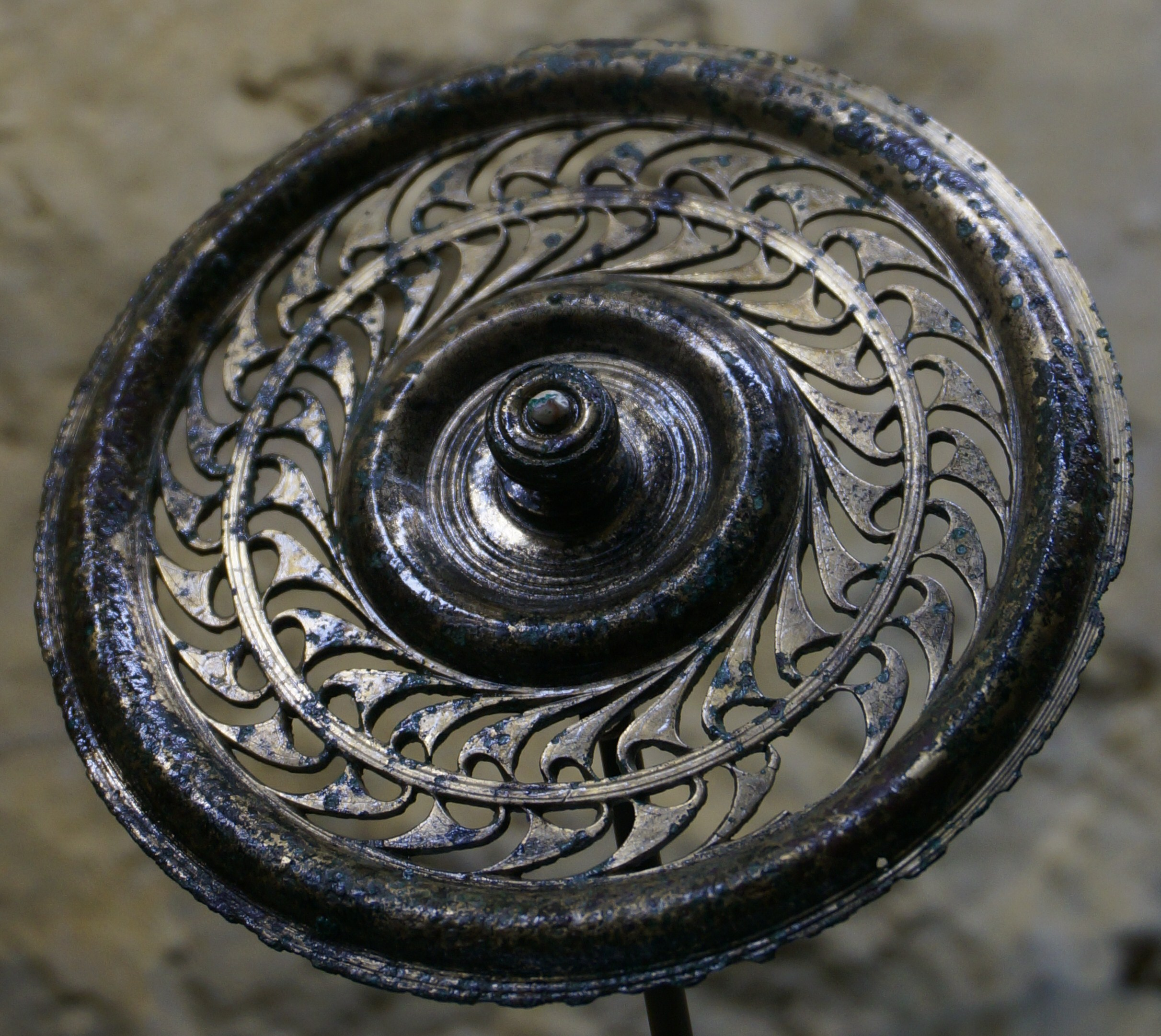
Chariot fitting, Bourcq, France, 5th century BC

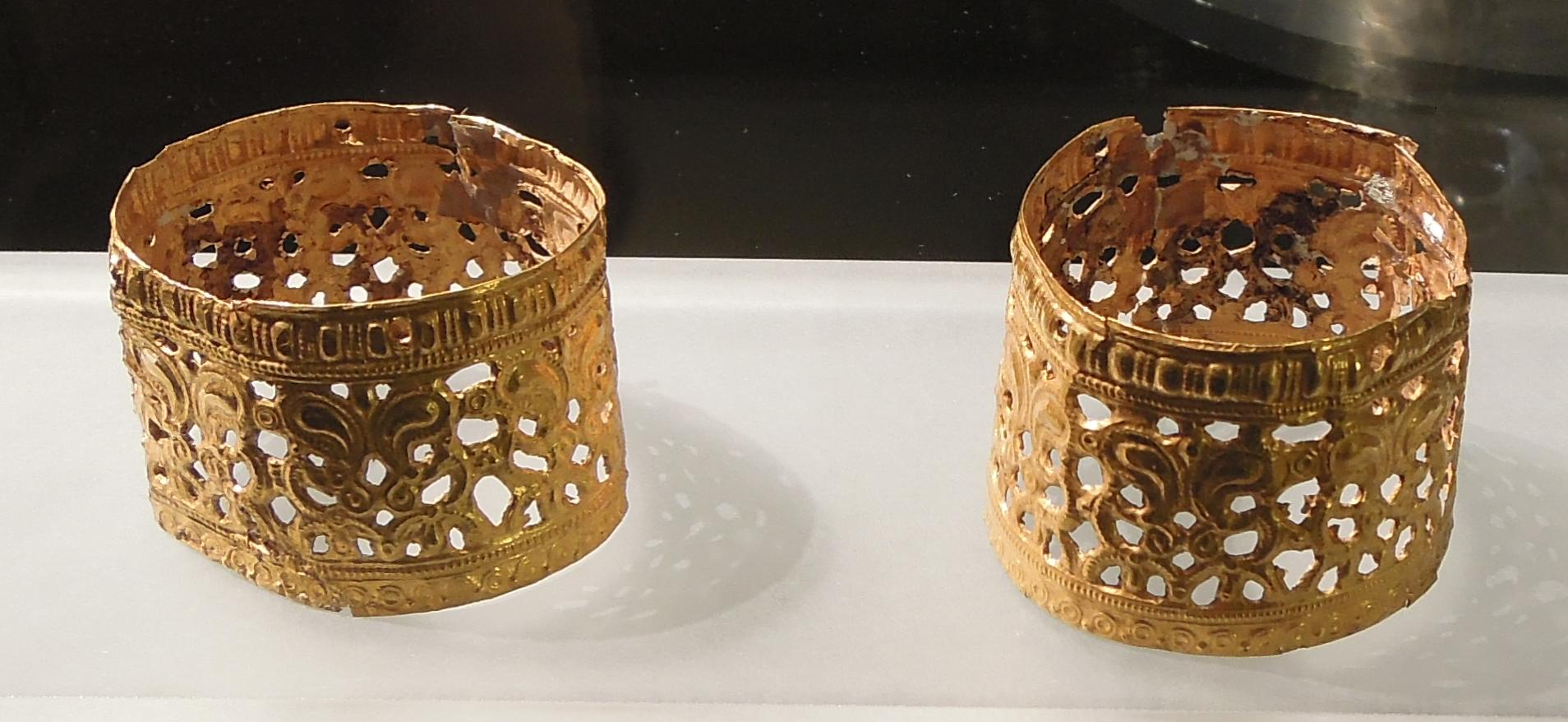
Gold armlets, Reinheim, Germany, 370 BC

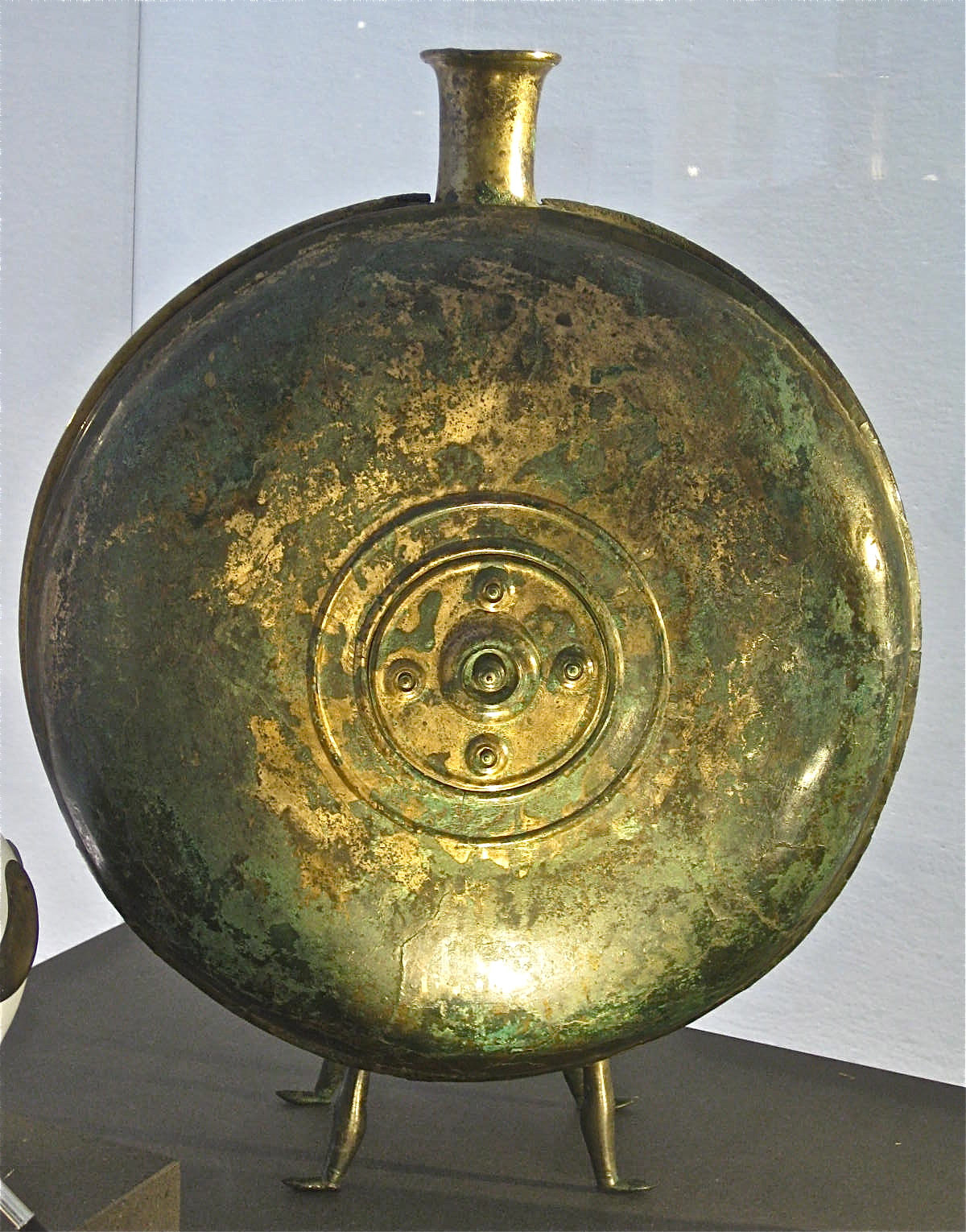
Bronze flask from the salt mines at Dürrnberg

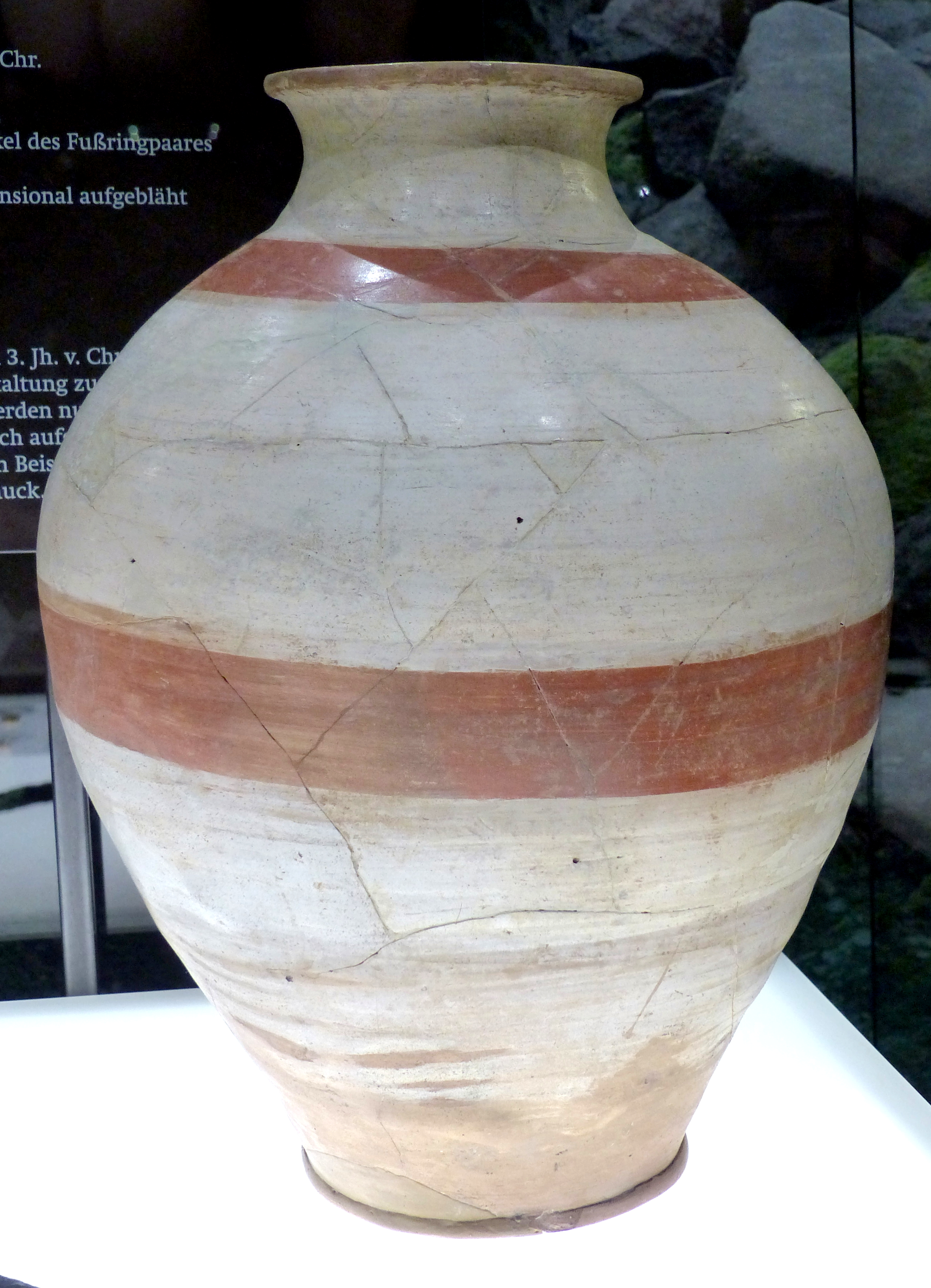
Mass-produced pottery from Manching, 2nd century BC

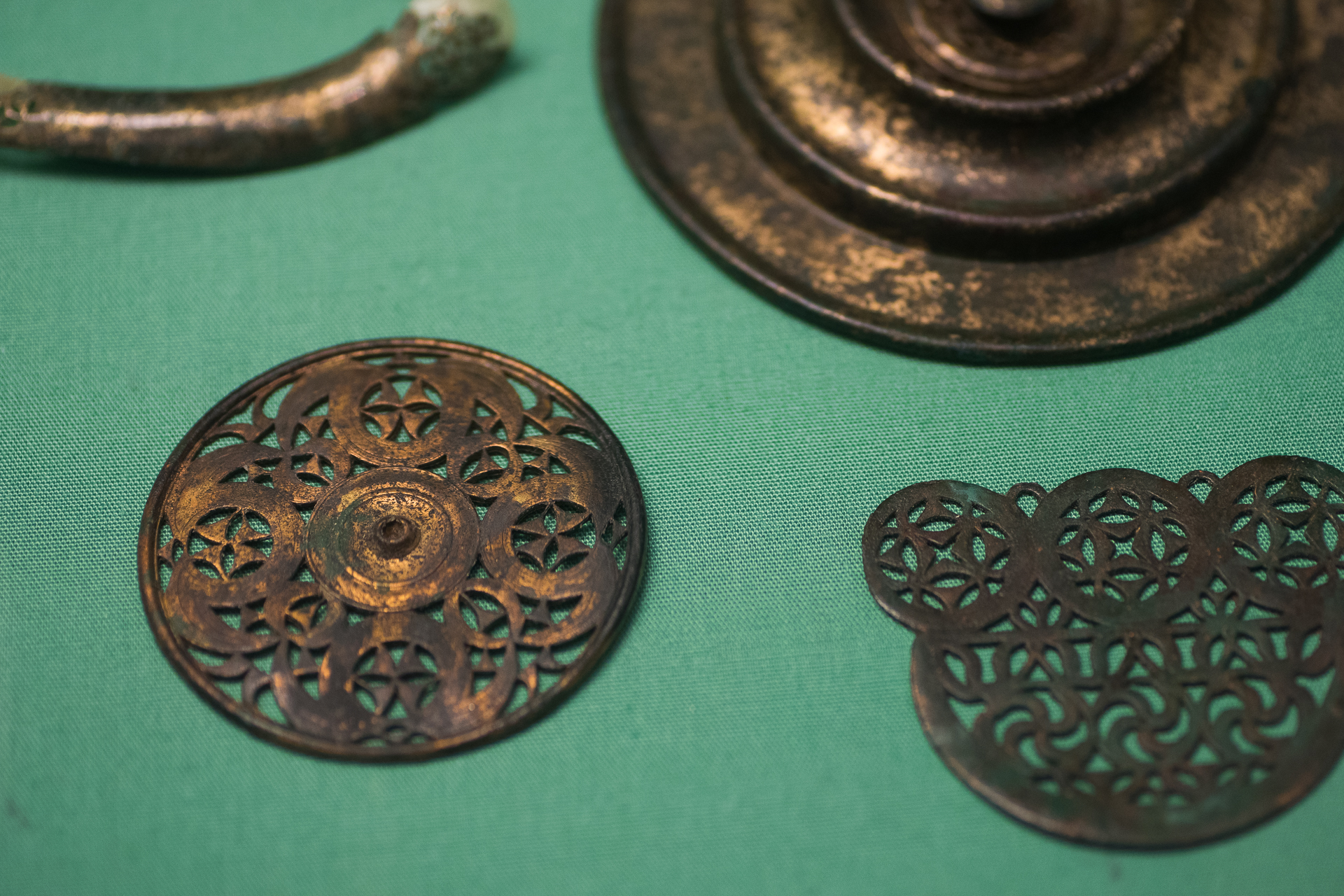
Chariot mounts from Somme-Bionne, c. 400 BC

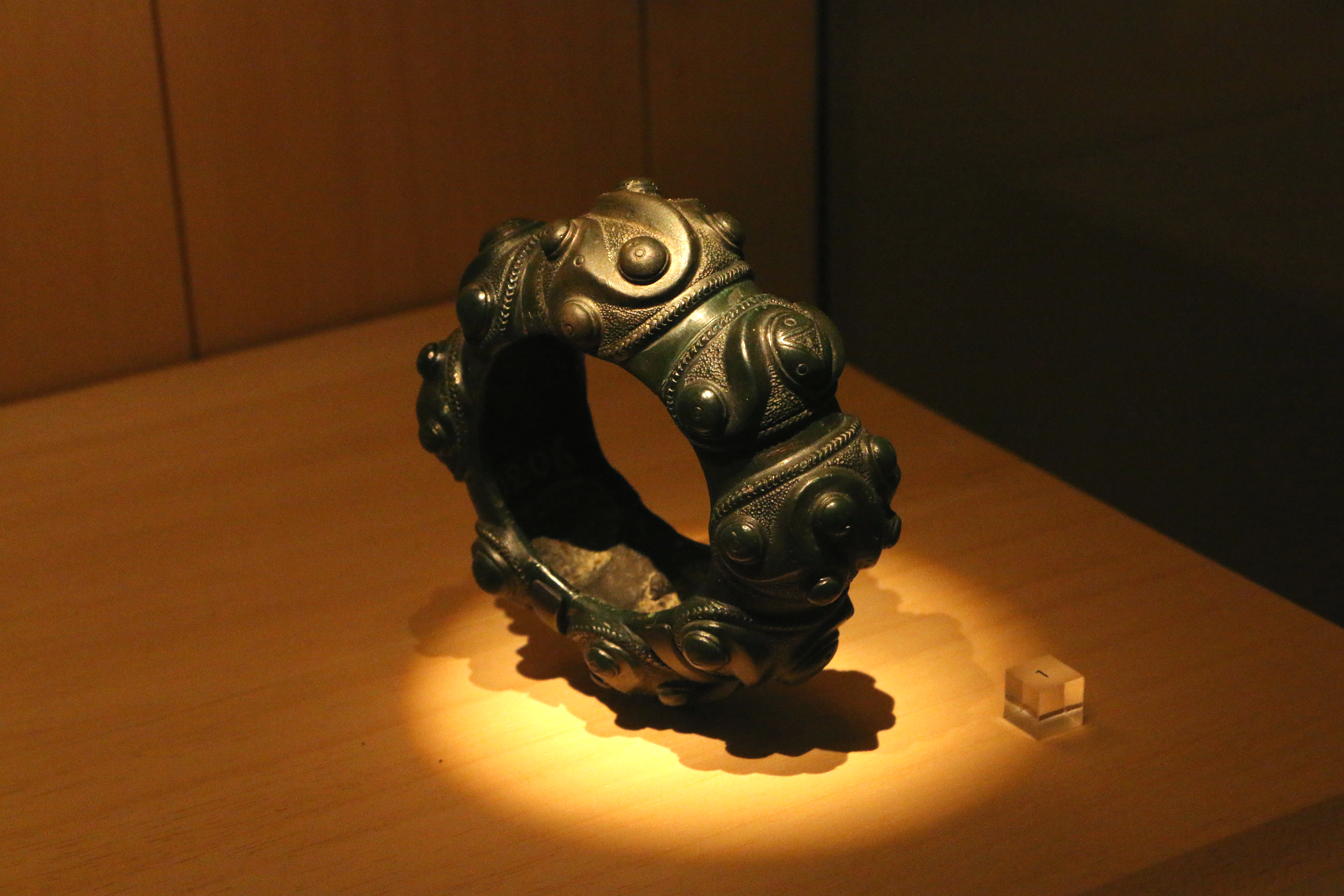
Bronze bracelet, France

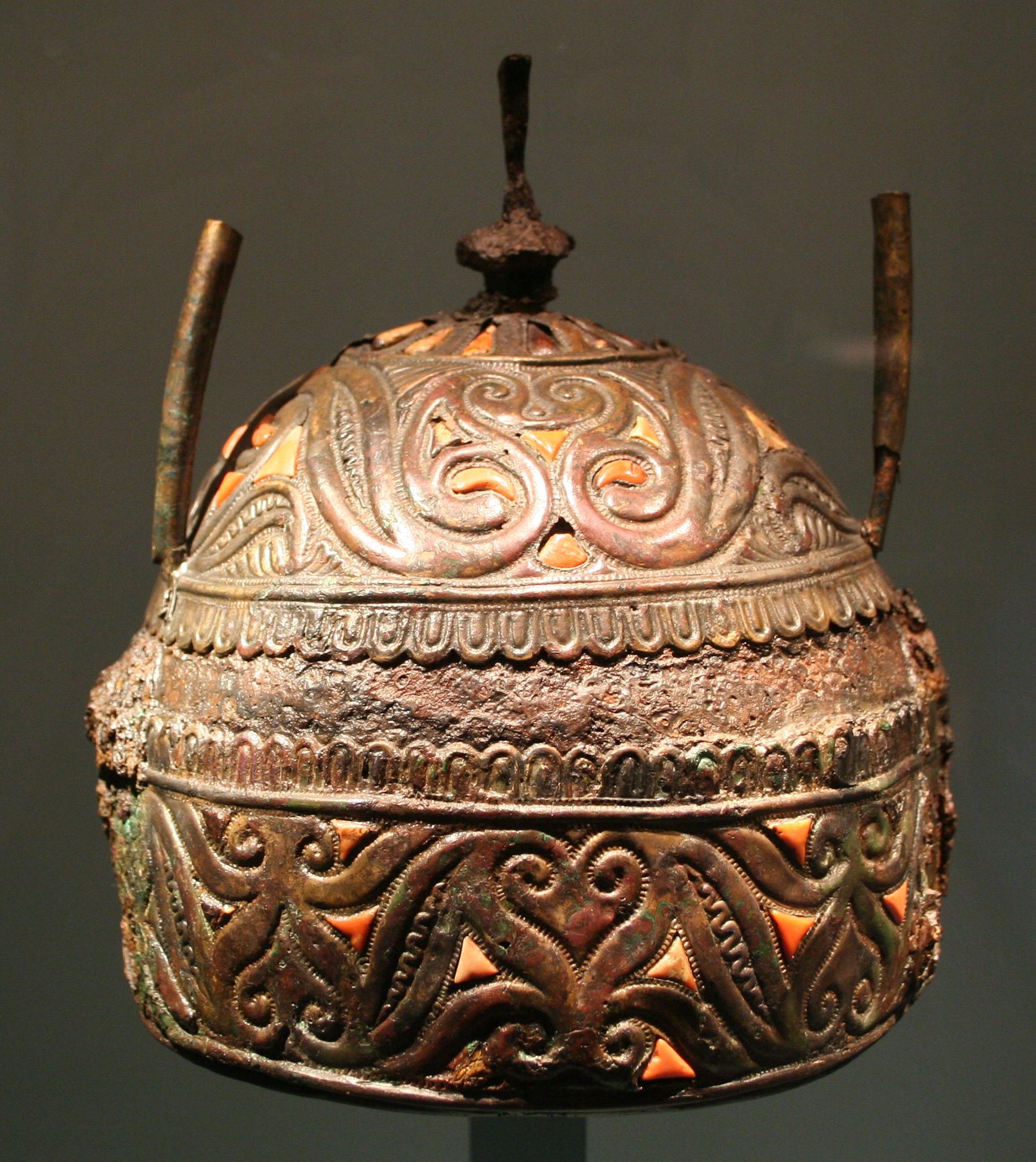
Helmet made of iron, bronze, and coral, Italy, 4th century BC

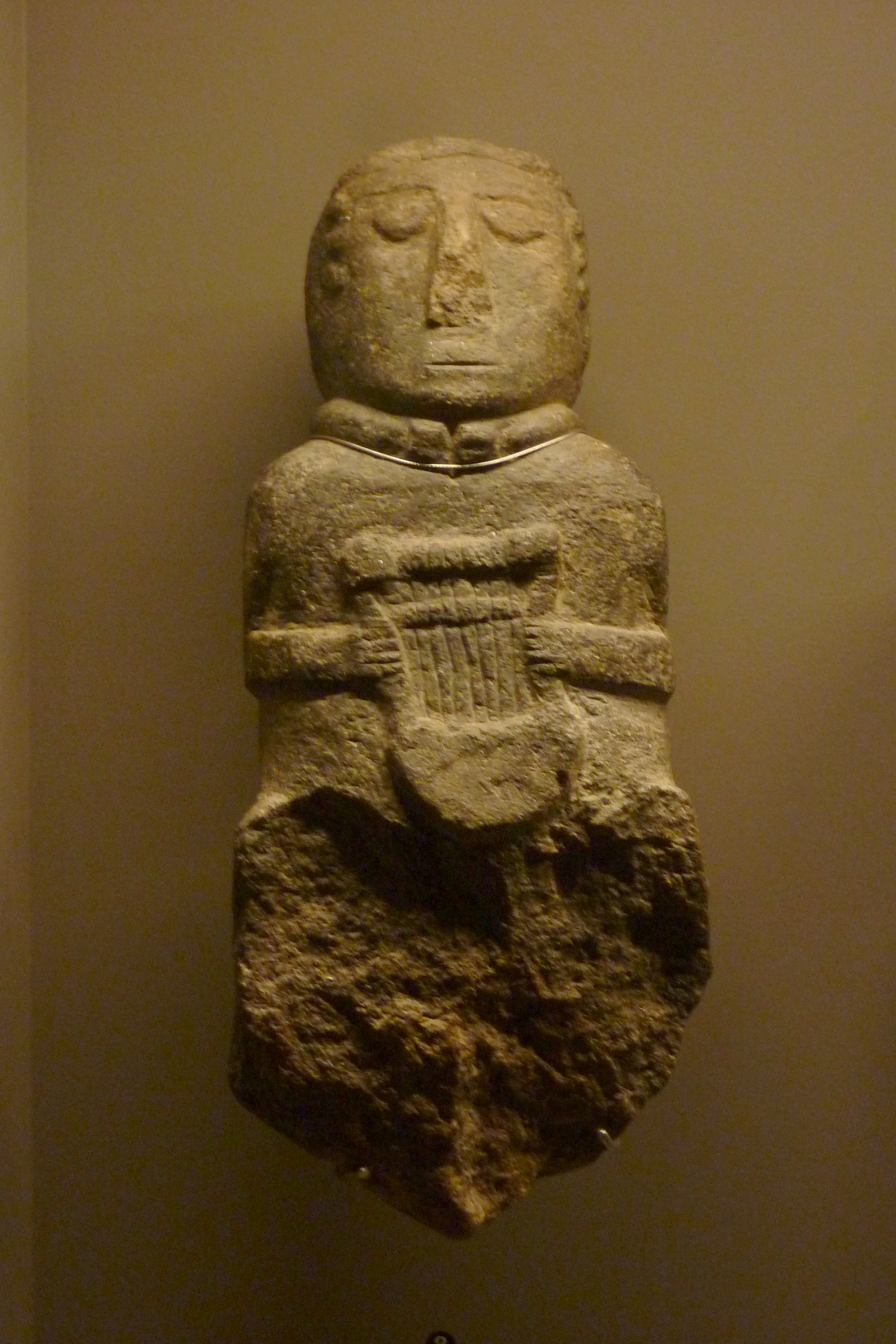
Statue of a bard with a lyre, France, 1st-2nd centuries BC

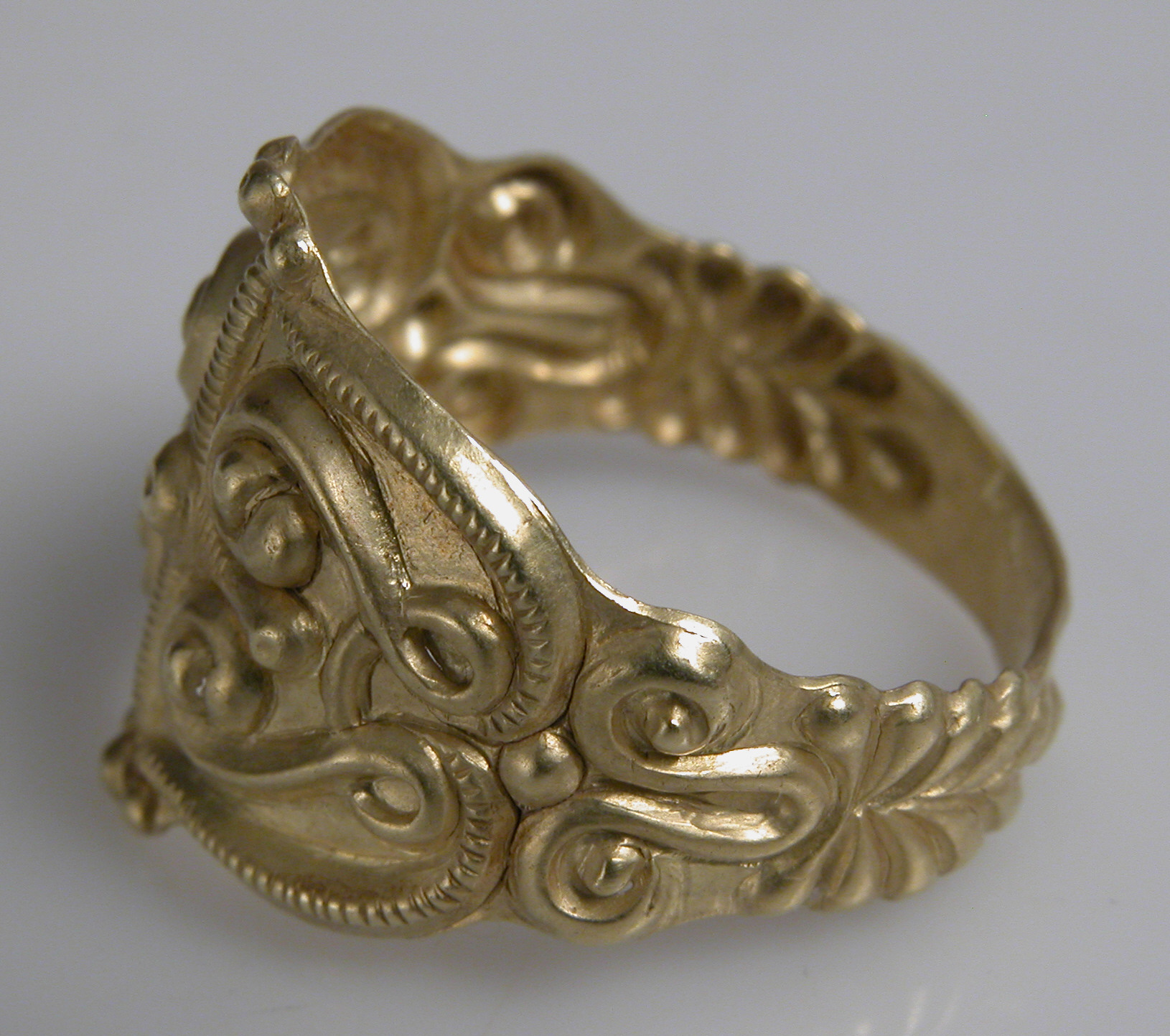
Gold ring, Germany, 5th-4th century BC

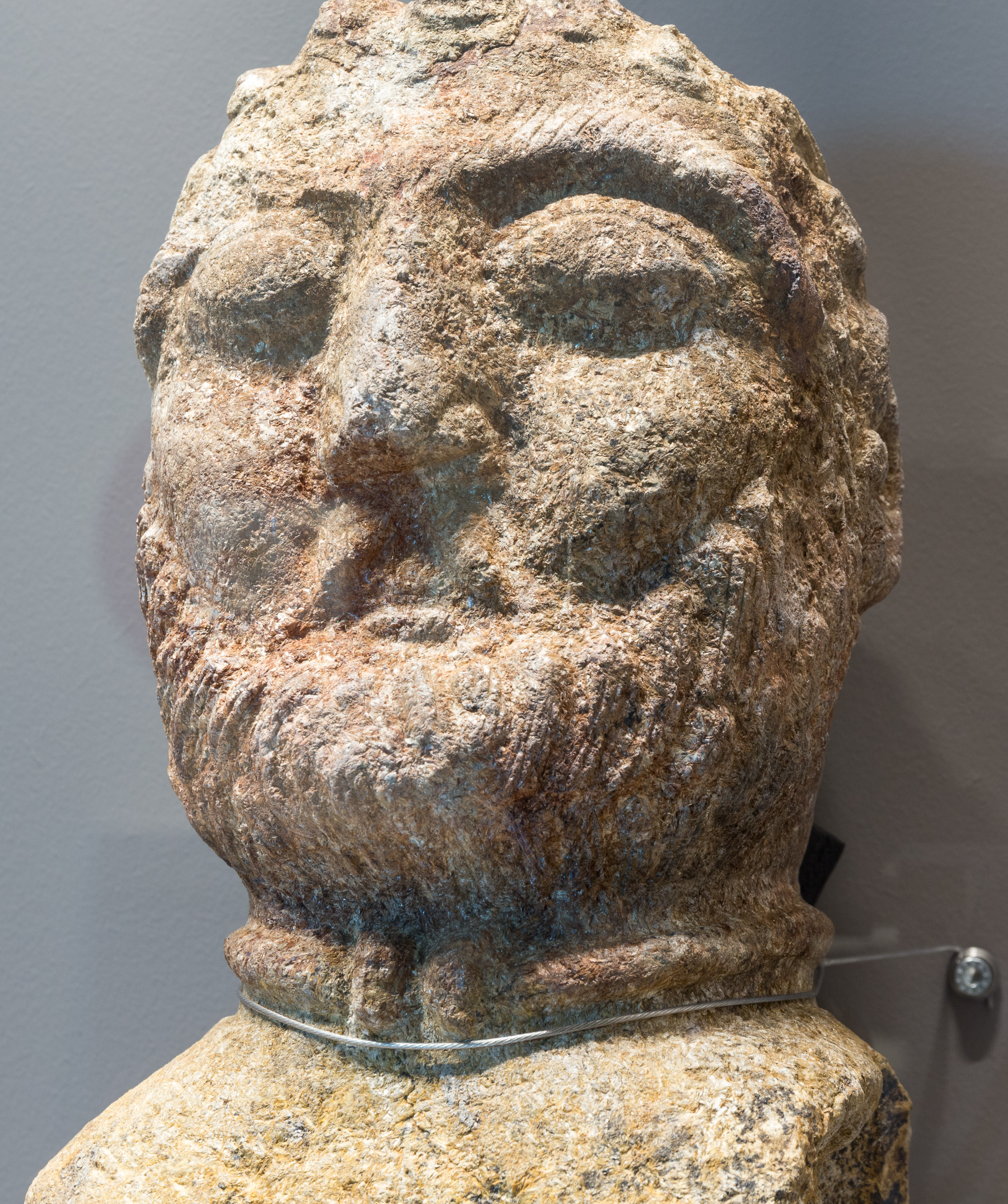
Bust of an aristocrat, Trémuson, France, 2nd-1st cent. BC

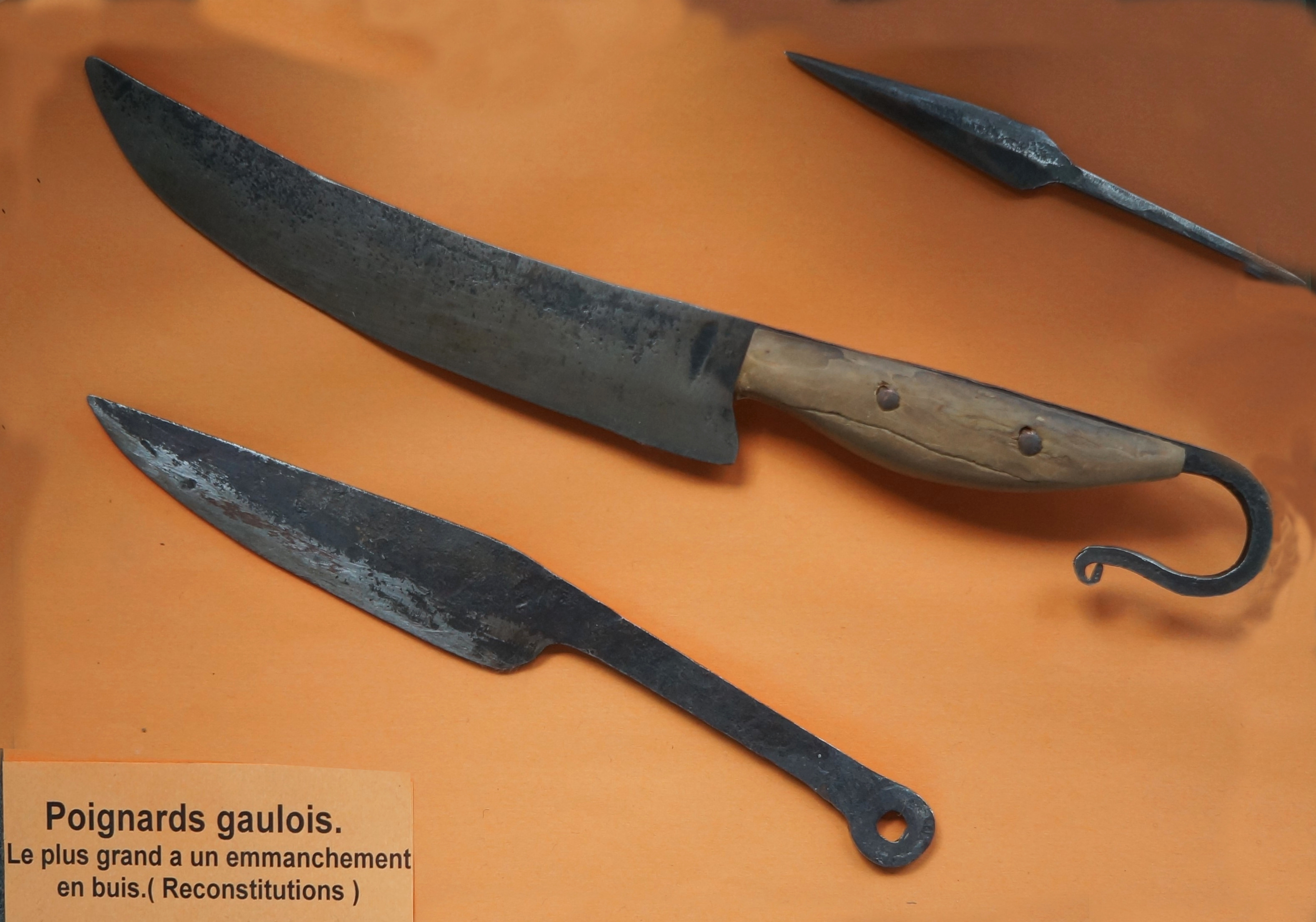
Gallic knives

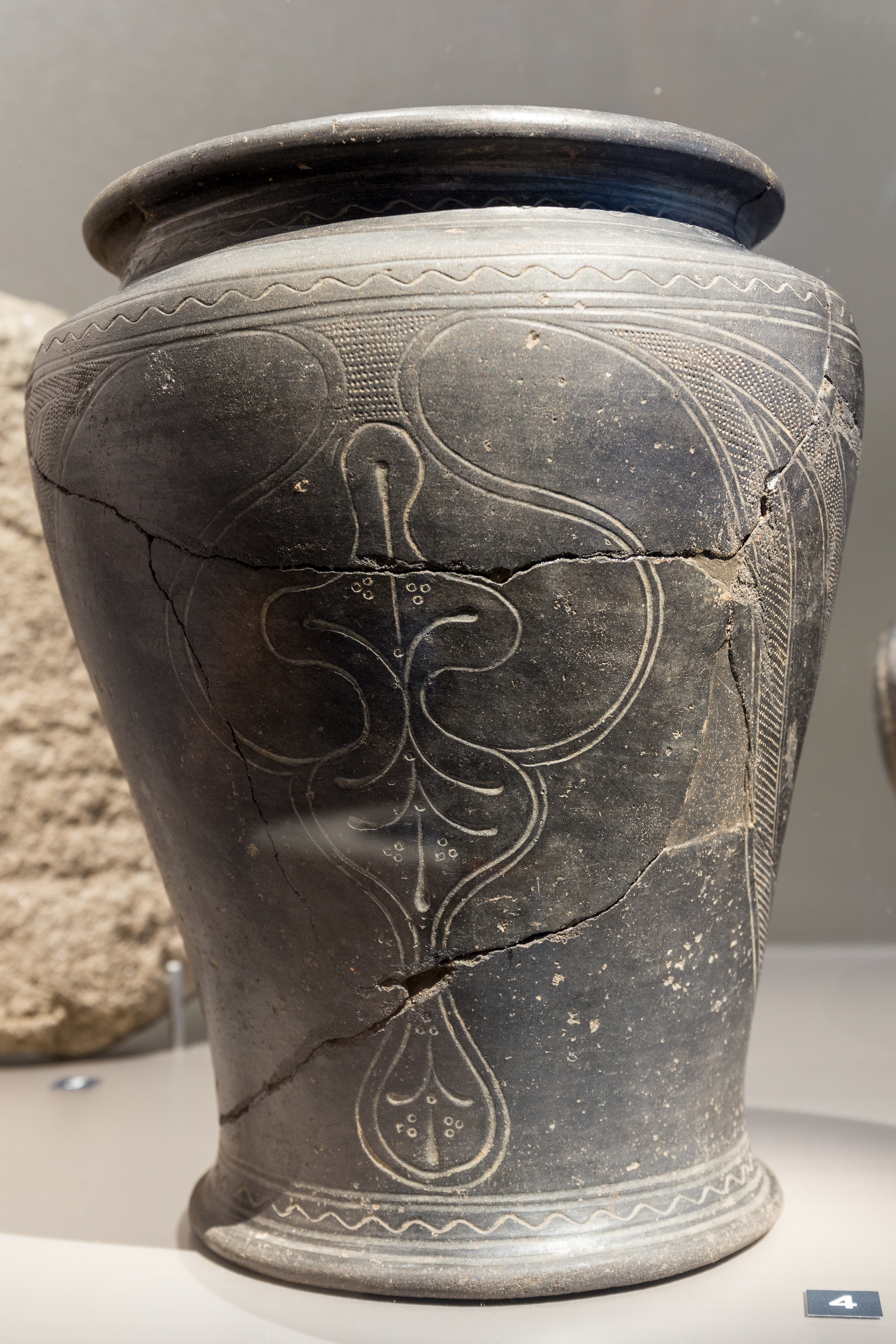
Saint-Pol-de-Léon Vase, (a cinerary urn)

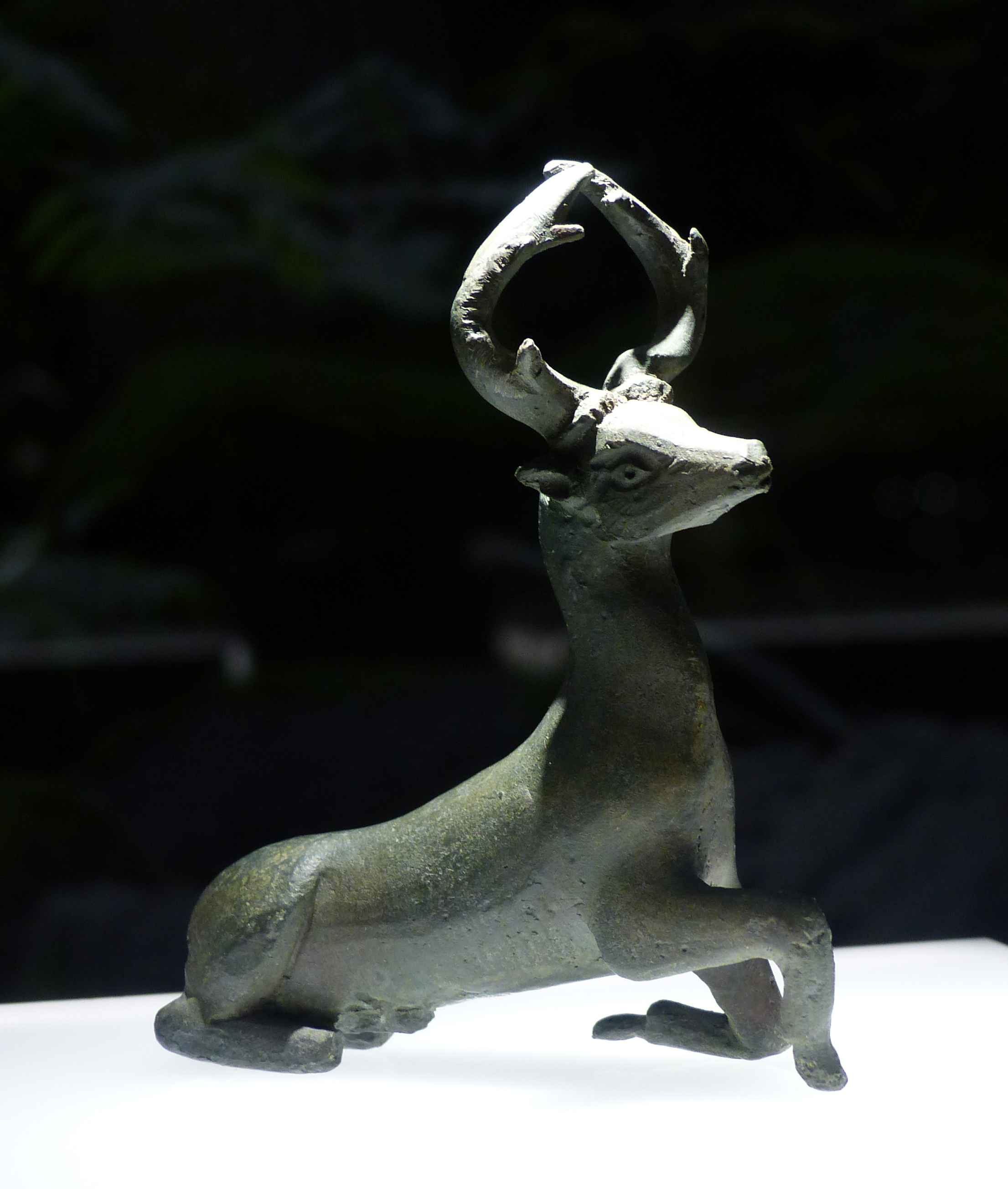
Deer sculpture found in Salzburg

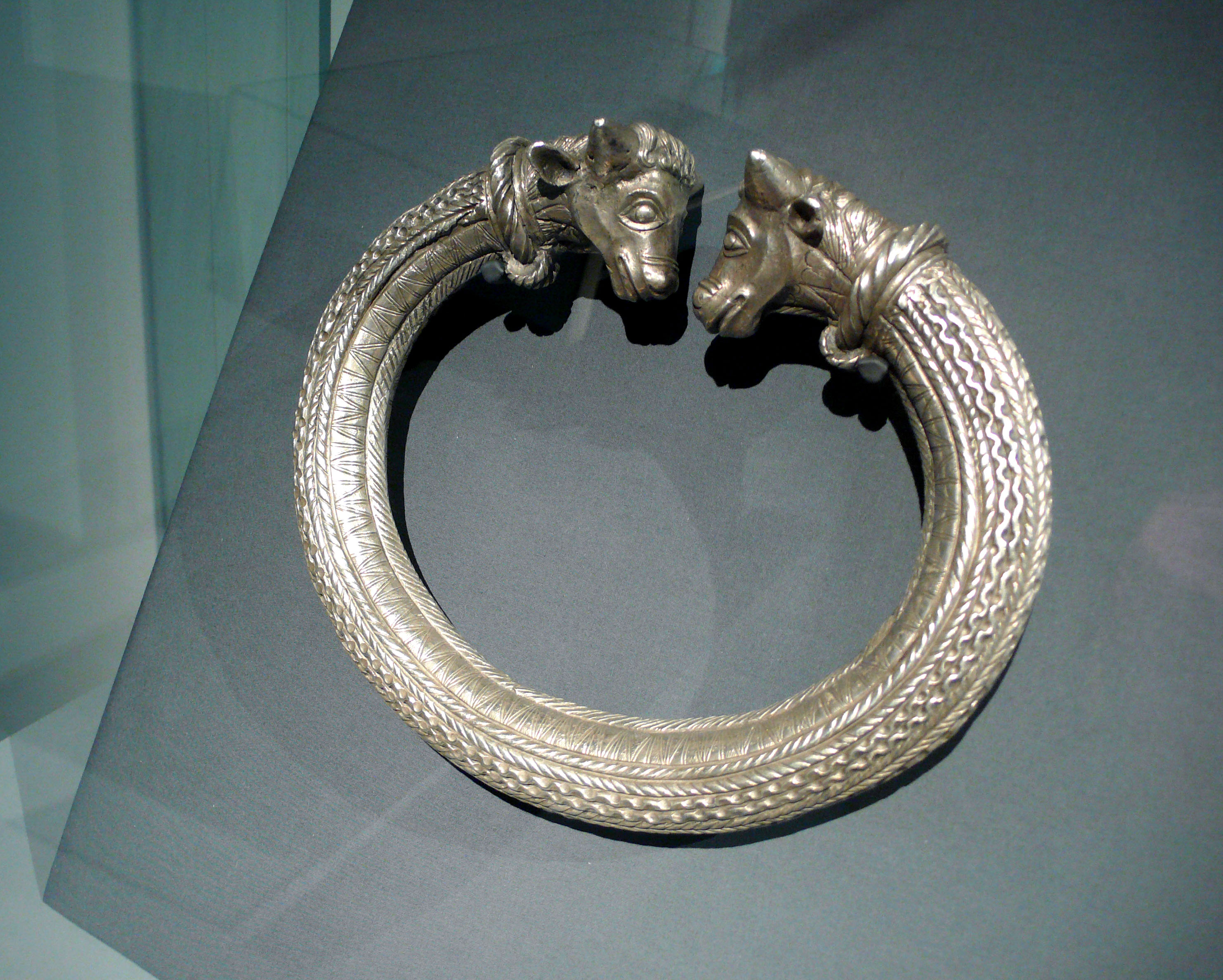
Silver torque, 1st Century BC, Germany

== Genetics ==
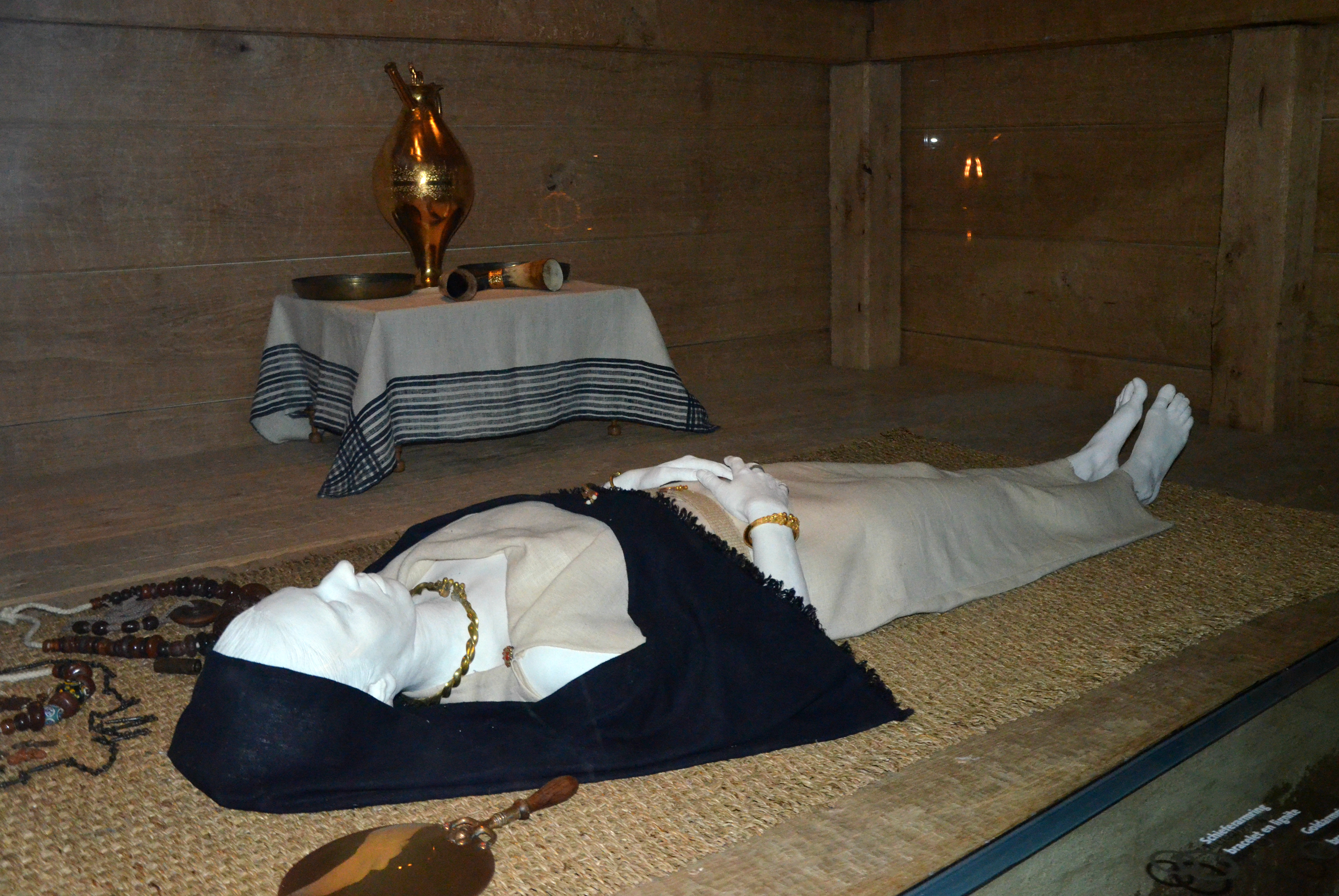
Princess of Reinheim burial reconstruction, Germany, c. 370 BC

A genetic study published in PLOS One in December 2018 examined 45 individuals buried at a La Tène necropolis in Urville-Nacqueville, France. The people buried there were identified as Gauls. The mtDNA of the examined individuals belonged primarily to haplotypes of H and U. They were found to be carrying a large amount of steppe ancestry, and to have been closely related to peoples of the preceding Bell Beaker culture, suggesting genetic continuity between Bronze Age and Iron Age France. Significant gene flow with Great Britain and Iberia was detected. The results of the study partially supported the notion that French people are largely descended from the Gauls.

A genetic study published in the Journal of Archaeological Science in October 2019 examined 43 maternal and 17 paternal lineages for the La Tène necropolis in Urville-Nacqueville, France, and 27 maternal and 19 paternal lineages for La Tène tumulus of Gurgy Les Noisats near modern Paris, France. The examined individuals displayed strong genetic resemblance to peoples of the earlier Yamnaya culture, Corded Ware culture and Bell Beaker culture. They carried a diverse set of maternal lineages associated with steppe ancestry. The paternal lineages were on the other hand characterized by a "striking homogeneity", belonging entirely to haplogroup R and R1b, both of whom are associated with steppe ancestry. The evidence suggested that the Gauls of the La Tène culture were patrilineal and patrilocal, which is in agreement with archaeological and literary evidence.

A genetic study published in the Proceedings of the National Academy of Sciences of the United States of America in June 2020 examined the remains of 25 individuals ascribed to the La Tène culture. The nine examples of individual Y-DNA extracted were determined to belong to either the paragroups or subclades of haplogroups R1b1a1a2 (R-M269; three examples), R1b1a1a2a1a2c1a1a1a1a1 (R-M222), R1b1 (R-L278), R1b1a1a (R-P297), I1 (I-M253), E1b1b (E-M215), or other, unspecified, subclades of haplogroup R. The 25 samples of mtDNA extracted was determined to belong to various subclades of haplogroup H, HV, U, K, J, V and W. The examined individuals of the Hallstatt culture and La Tène culture were genetically highly homogeneous and displayed continuity with the earlier Bell Beaker culture. They carried about 50% steppe-related ancestry.

A genetic study published in iScience in April 2022 examined 49 genomes from 27 sites in Bronze Age and Iron Age France. The study found evidence of strong genetic continuity between the two periods, particularly in southern France. The samples from northern and southern France were highly homogeneous, with northern samples displaying links to contemporary samples form Great Britain and Sweden, and southern samples displaying links to Celtiberians. The northern French samples were distinguished from the southern ones by elevated levels of steppe-related ancestry. R1b was by far the most dominant paternal lineage, while H was the most common maternal lineage. The Iron Age samples resembled those of modern-day populations of France, Great Britain and Spain. The evidence suggested that the Gauls of the La Tène culture largely evolved from local Bronze Age populations.

Laffranchi et al. 2024 examined 12 samples of Cenomani Cisalpine Gauls from Verona who lived between the 3rd and 1st centuries BCE. The five examples of individual Y-DNA extracted were determined to belong to either haplogroup I2a1b1a1b1 or subclades of R1b1a1b (R-M269). The 12 samples of mtDNA extracted belonged to various subclades of haplogroup H, T, U, K, J and X.

== Gallery ==
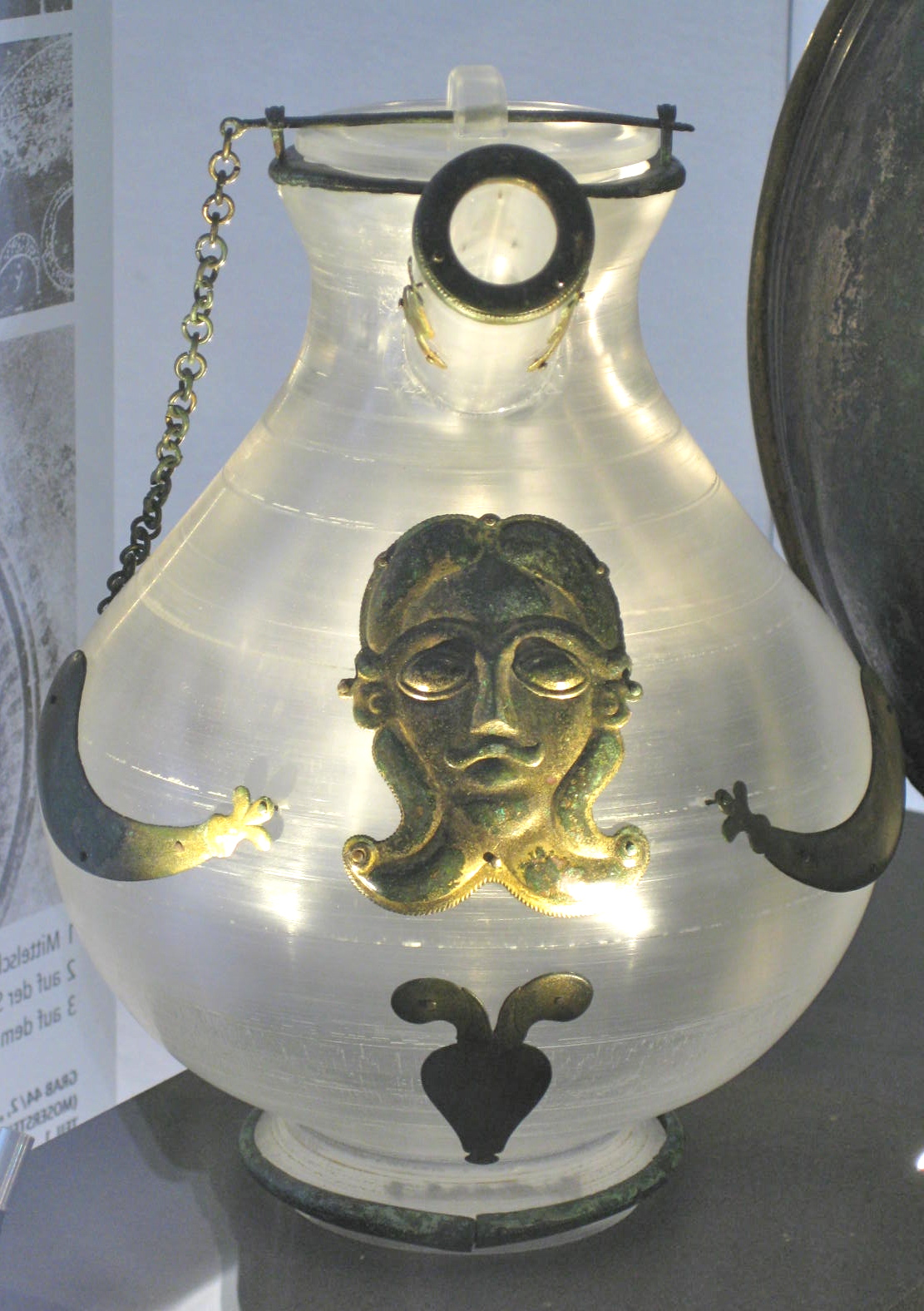
Jug (glass replica) with bronze mounting found in Hallein, Austria

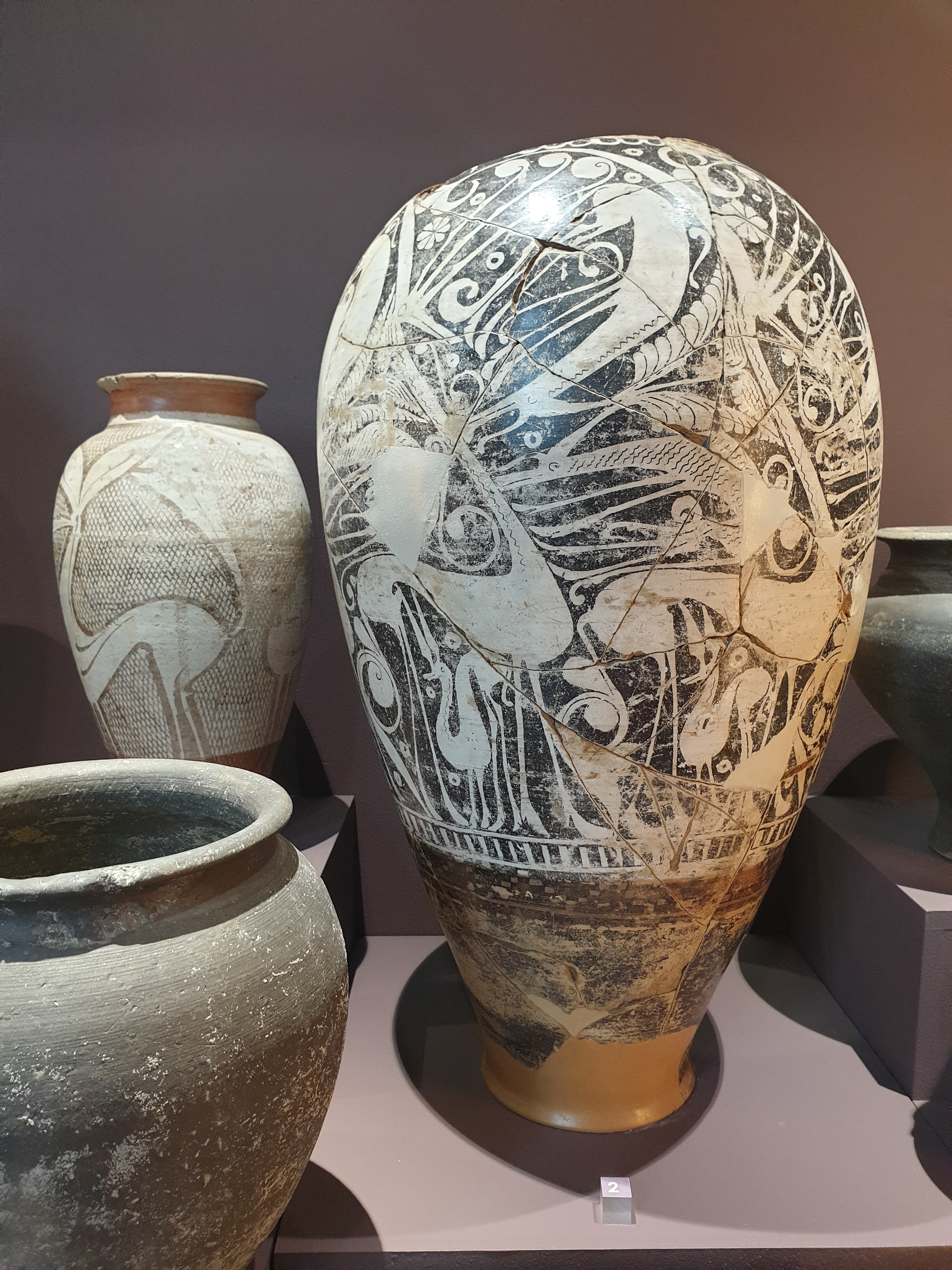
Painted pottery, France

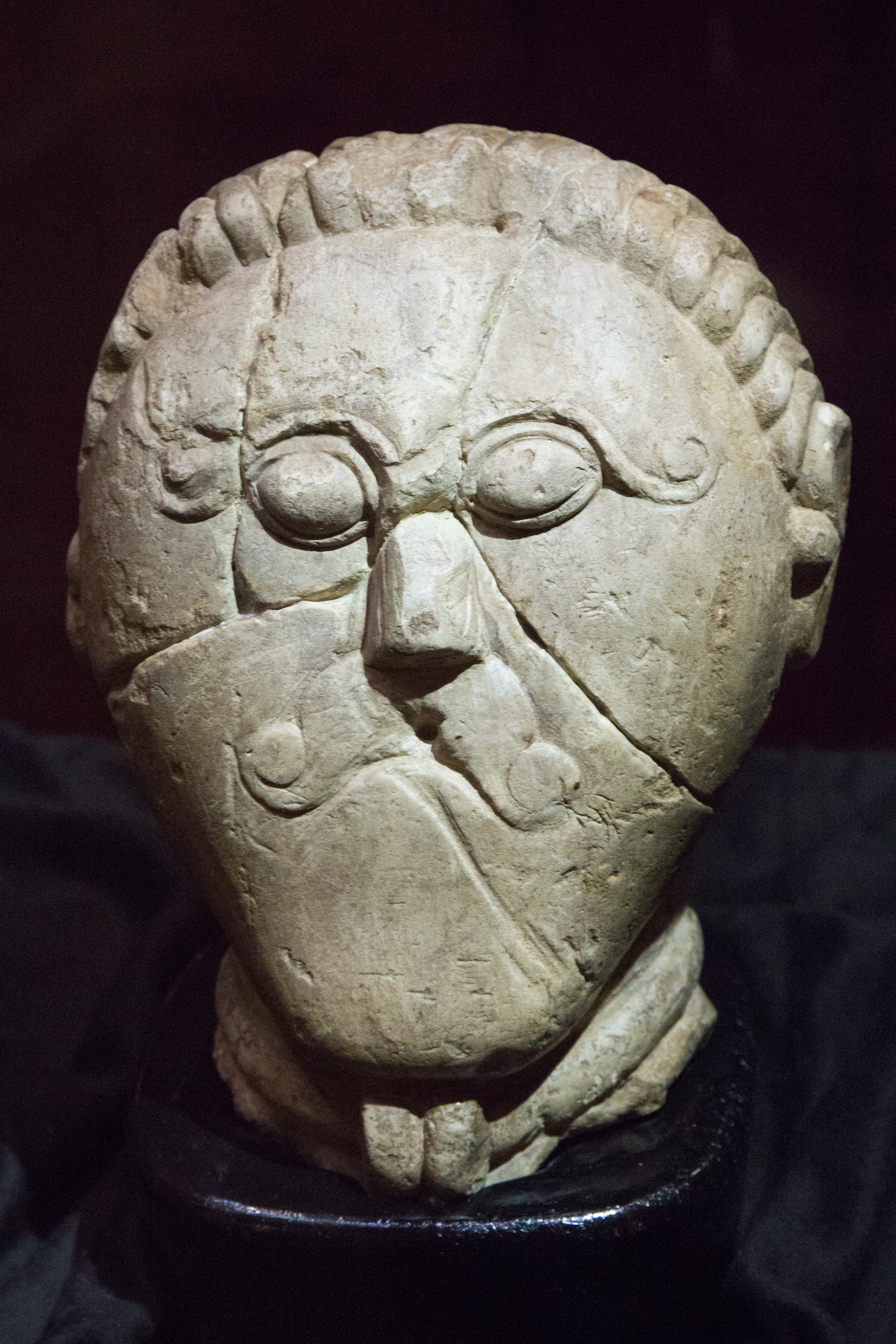
The Mšecké Žehrovice Head, Bohemia, c. 150–50 BC

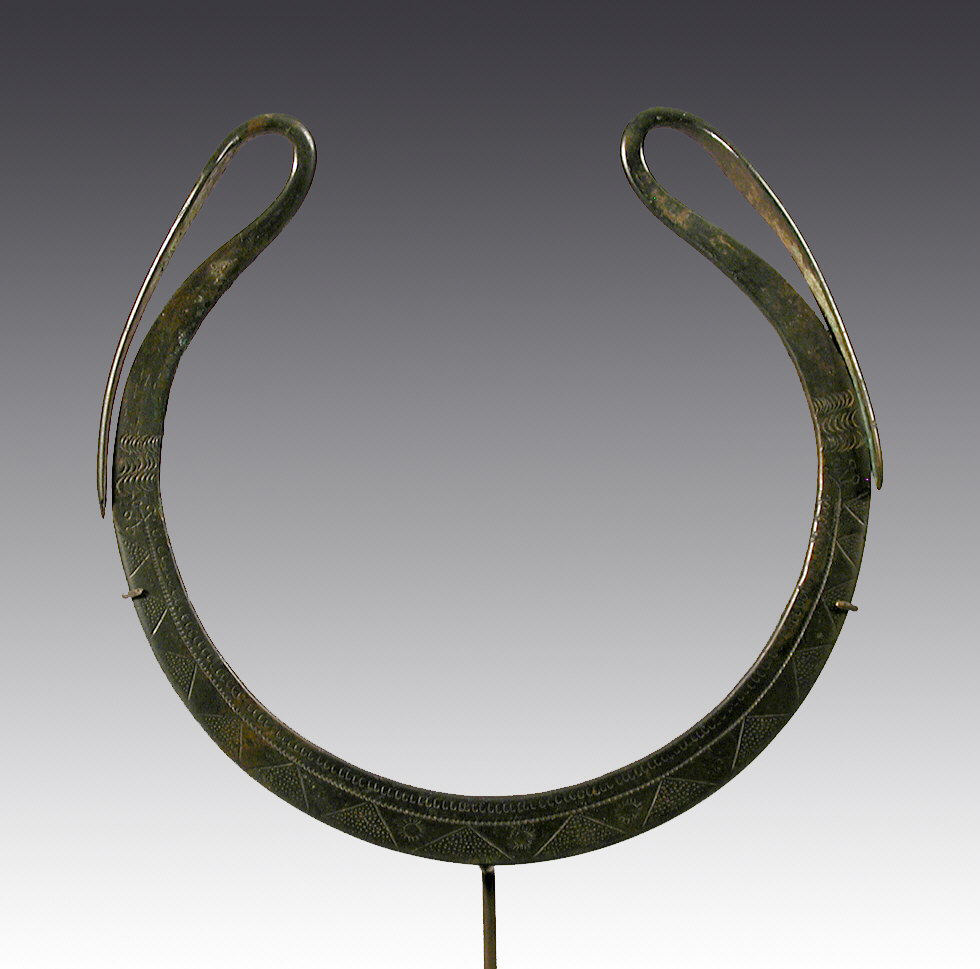
Celtic torc

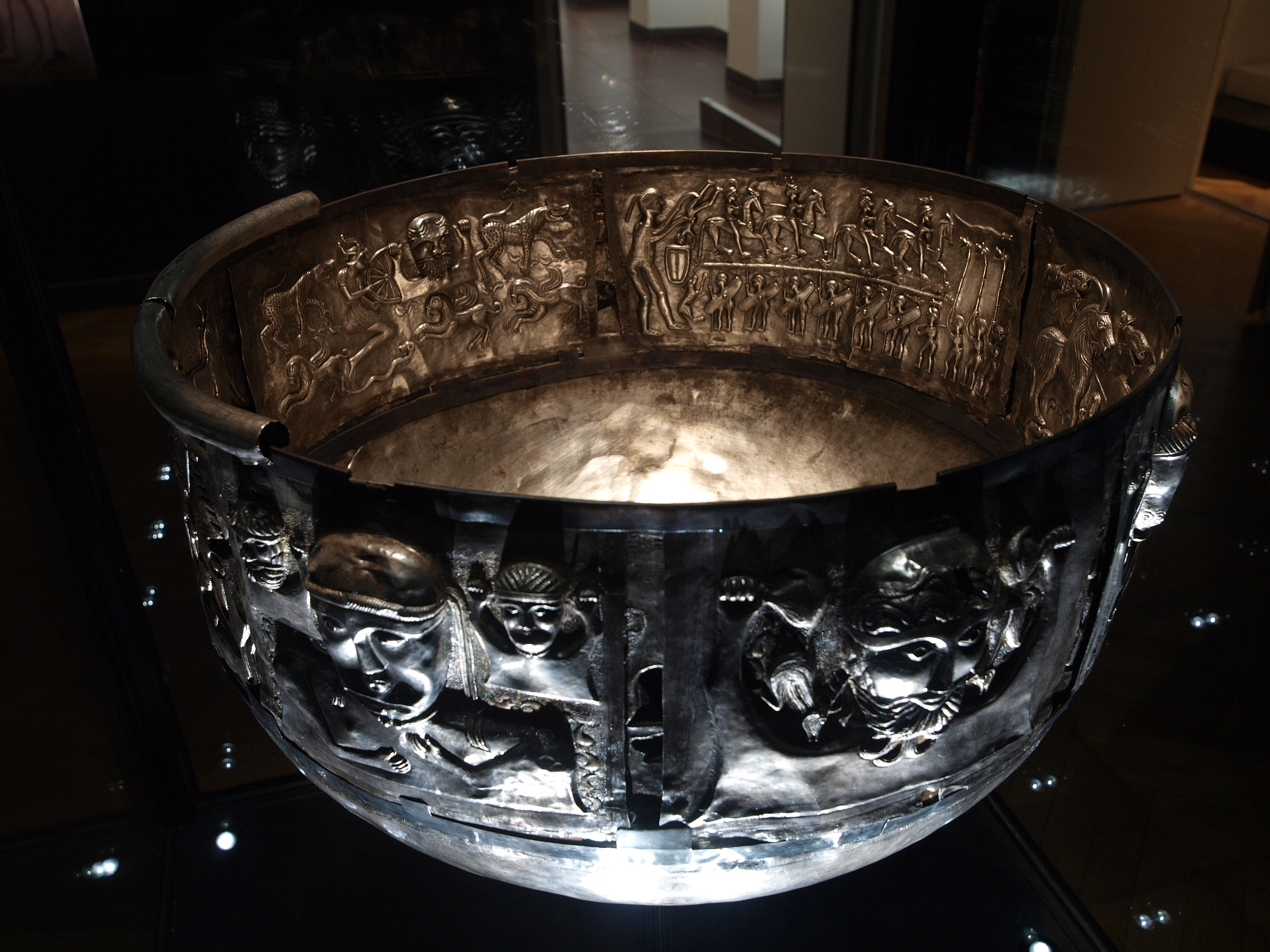
Gundestrup Cauldron, Denmark

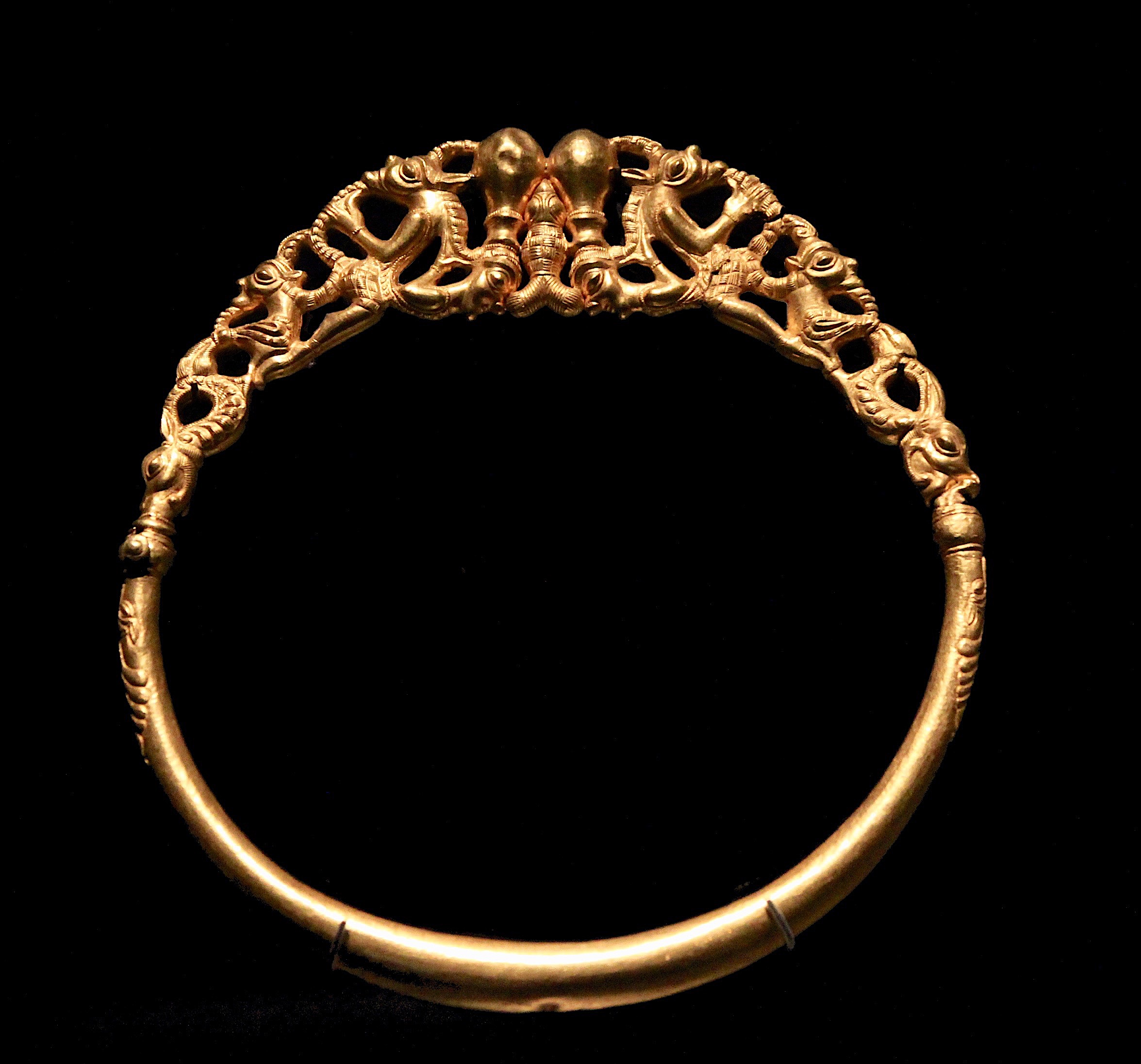
Gold jewelry from Erstfeld, Switzerland

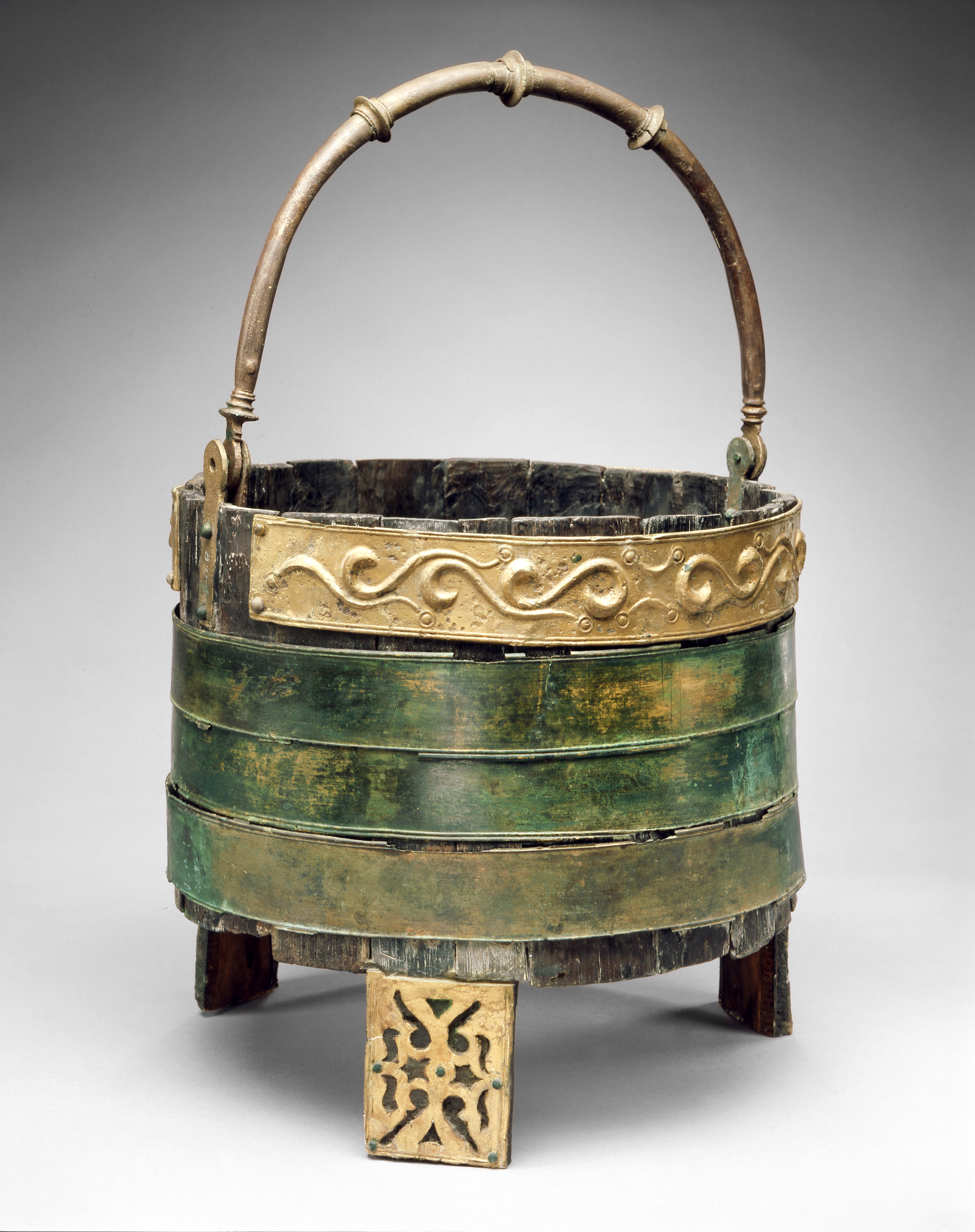
Yew wood bucket with bronze decoration, from Luxembourg

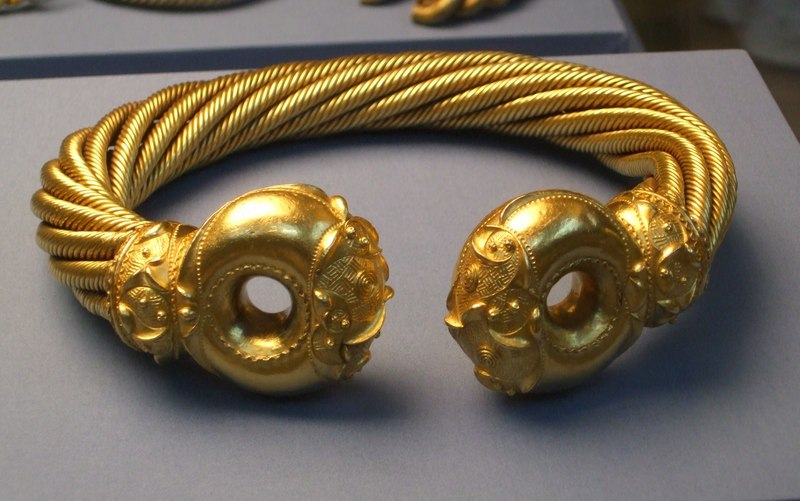
Great Torc from Snettisham, England

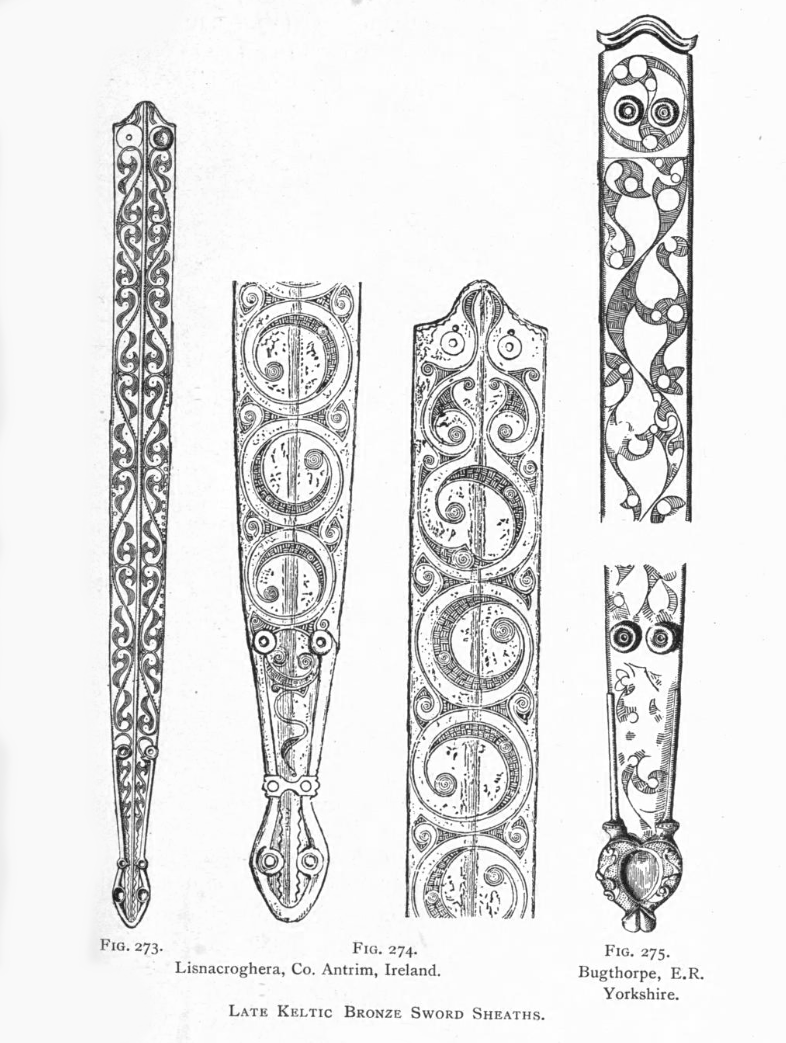
Decorated metal sword scabbards, Britain & Ireland

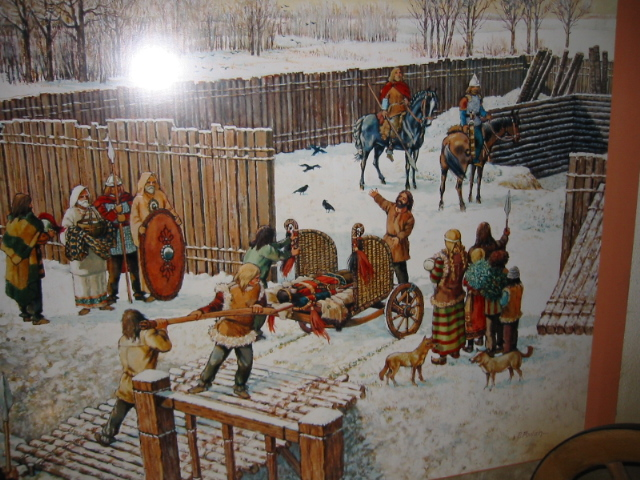
Chariot burial

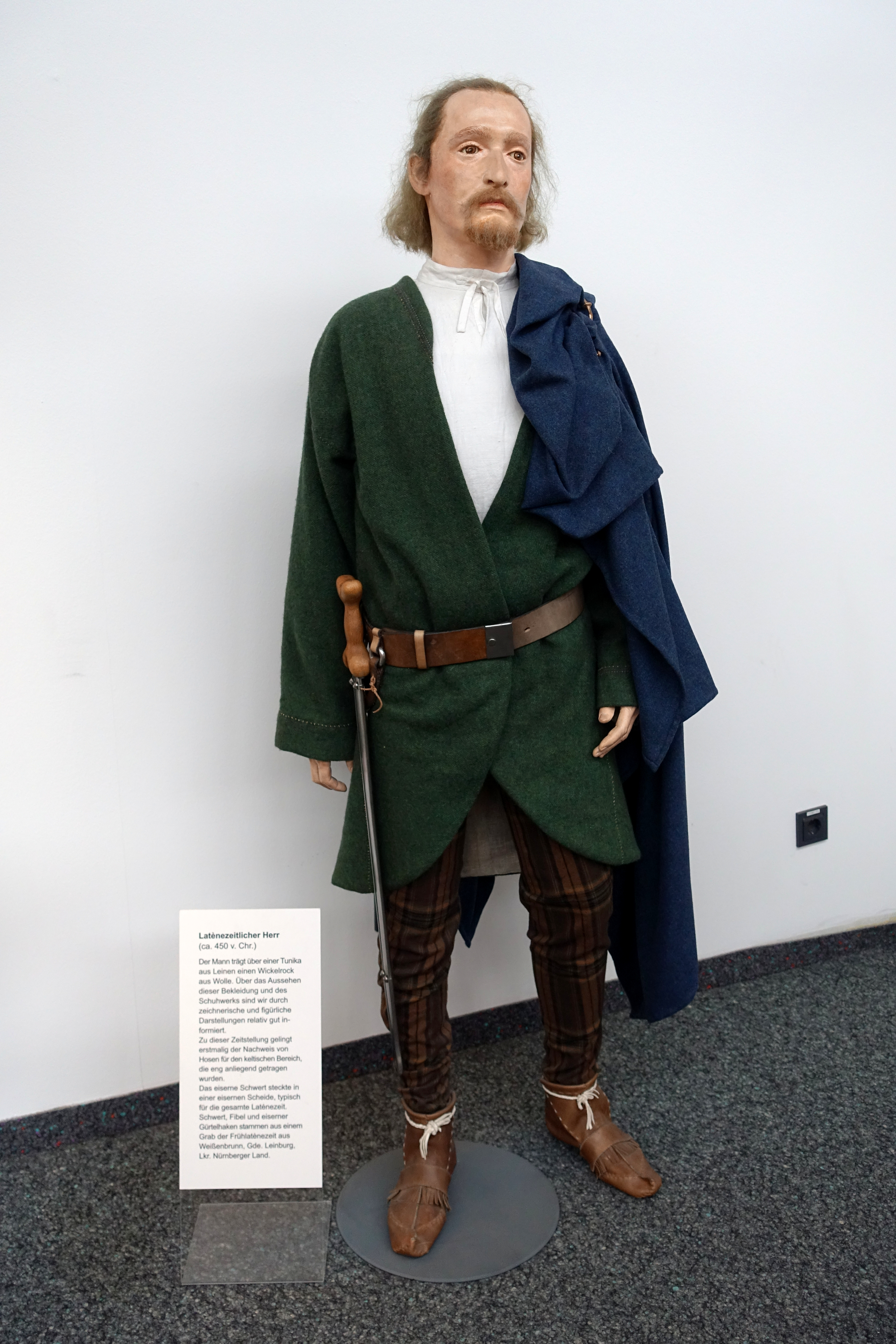
Reconstruction of clothing, Germany, c. 450 BC

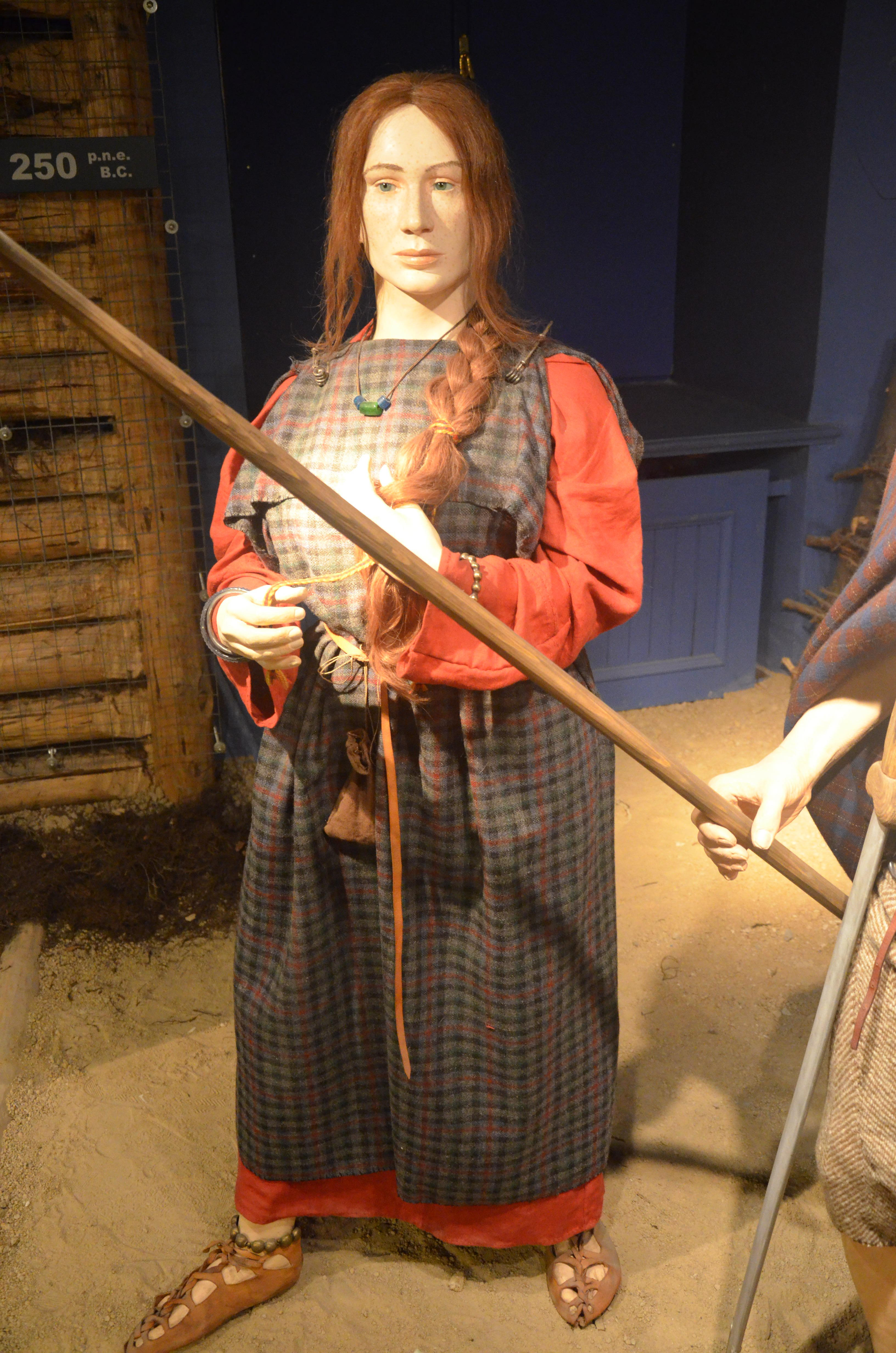
Reconstruction of clothing, Poland, c. 300 BC

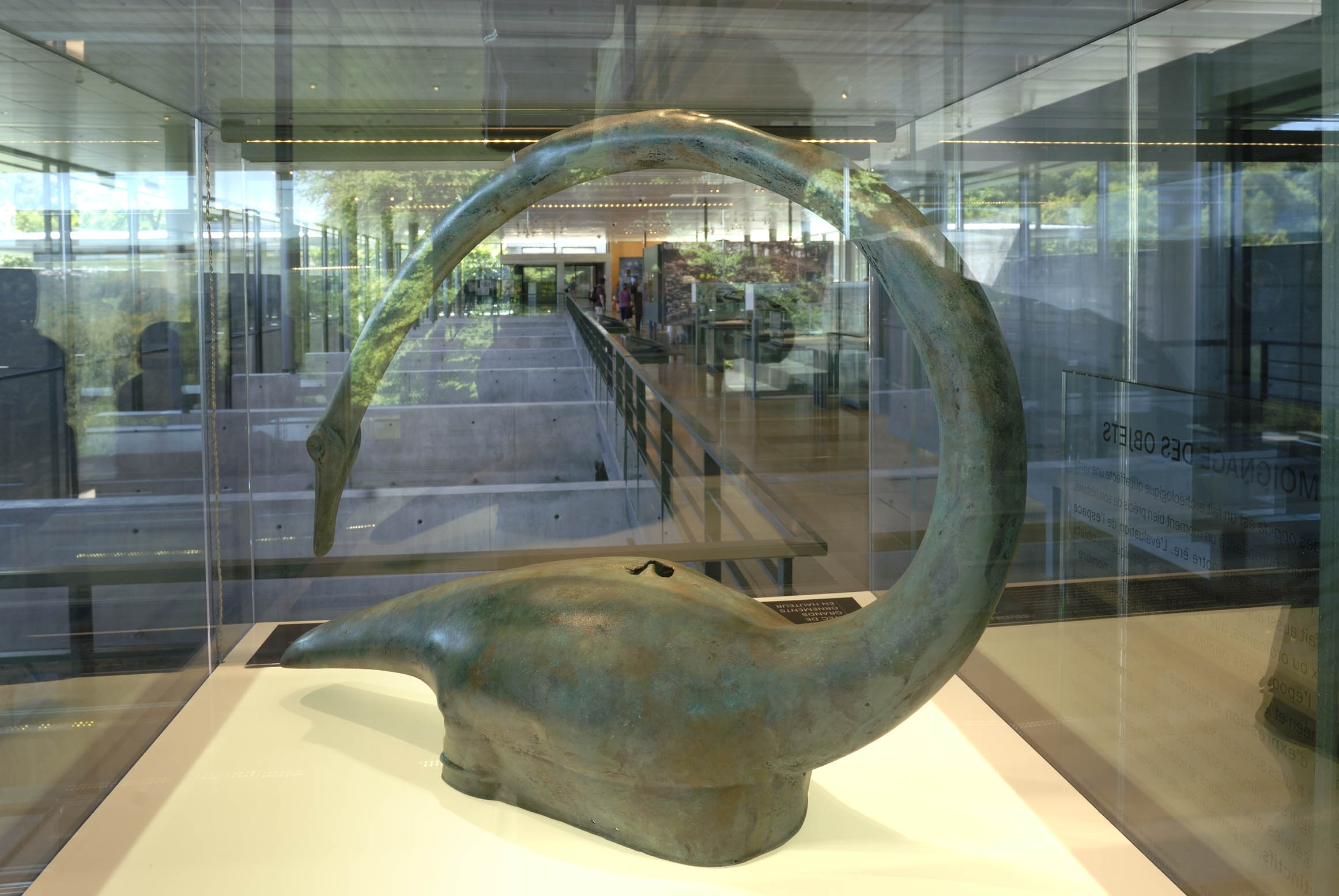
Helmet in the form of a swan from Tintignac, France

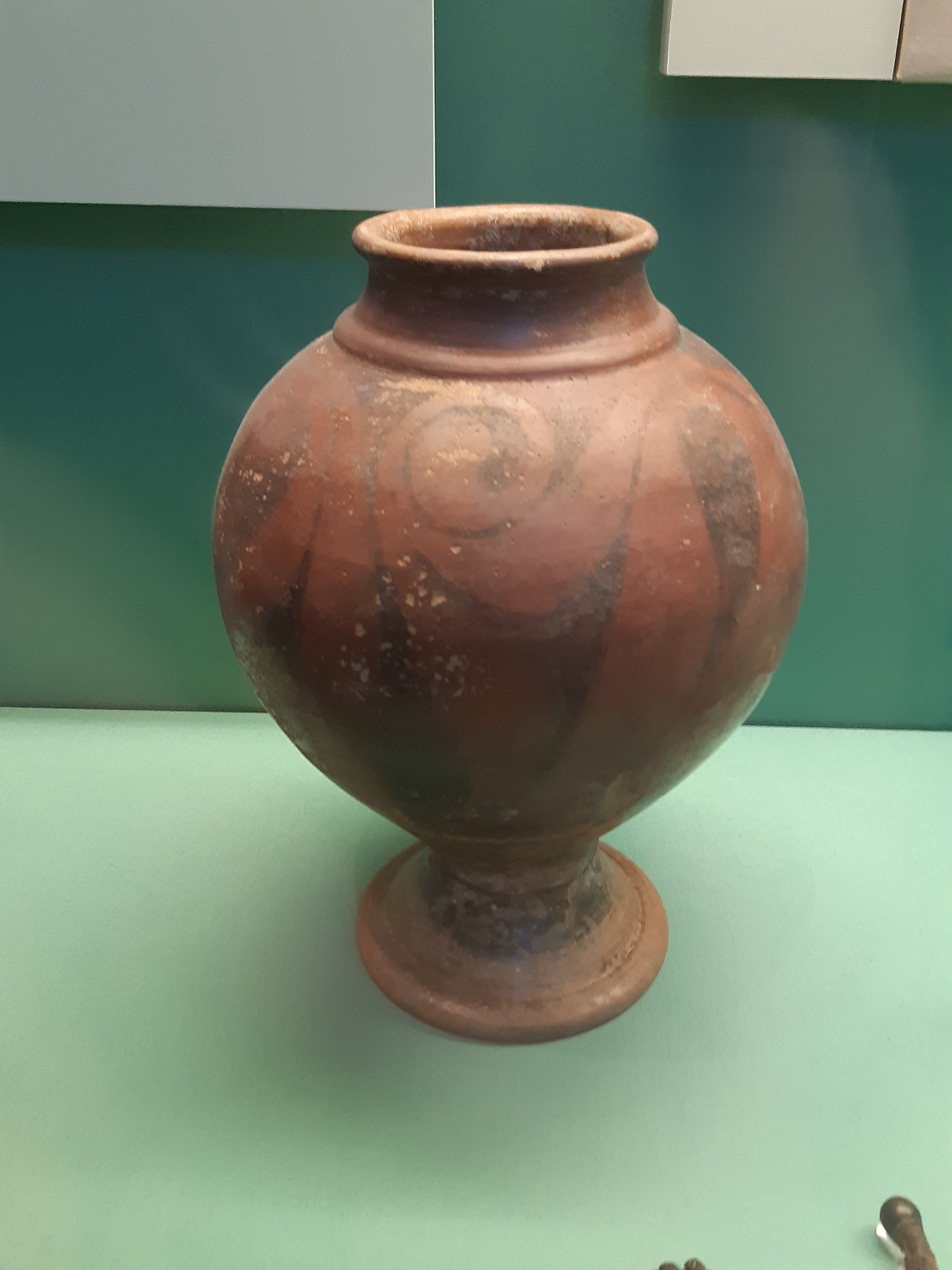
Pottery with intricate design from Prunay, France, c.400-350 BC

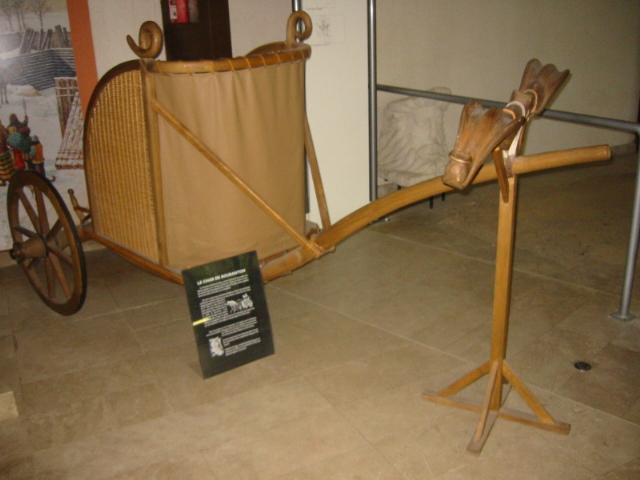
Chariot reconstruction

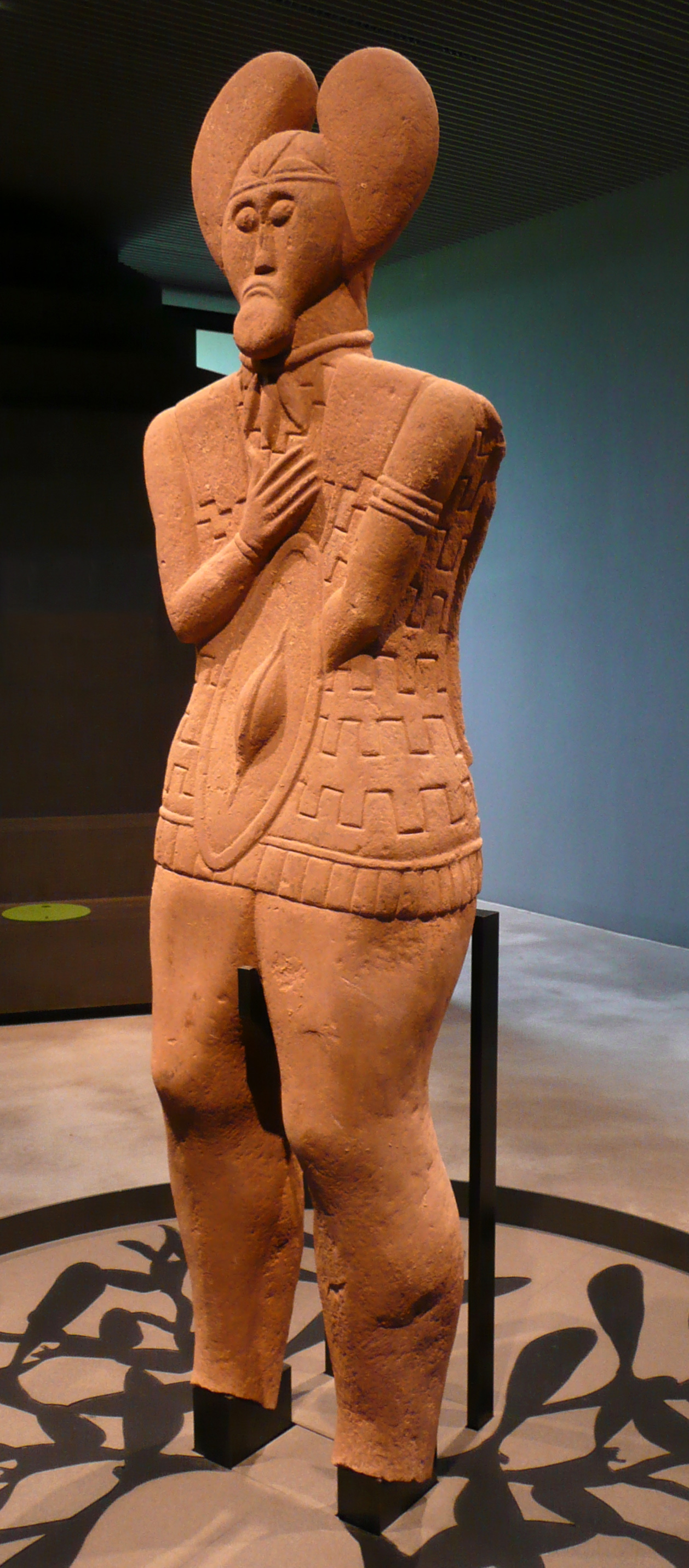
The 'Prince of Glauberg' stone statue, 5th century BC

== See also ==
- Archaeology of Northern Europe
- Iron Age Britain
- Iron Age France
- Iron Age Iberia
- Jublains archeological site
- Krakus Mound, Poland
- Tasciaca
