= Meyrick Helmet =

Iron Age archaeological discovery

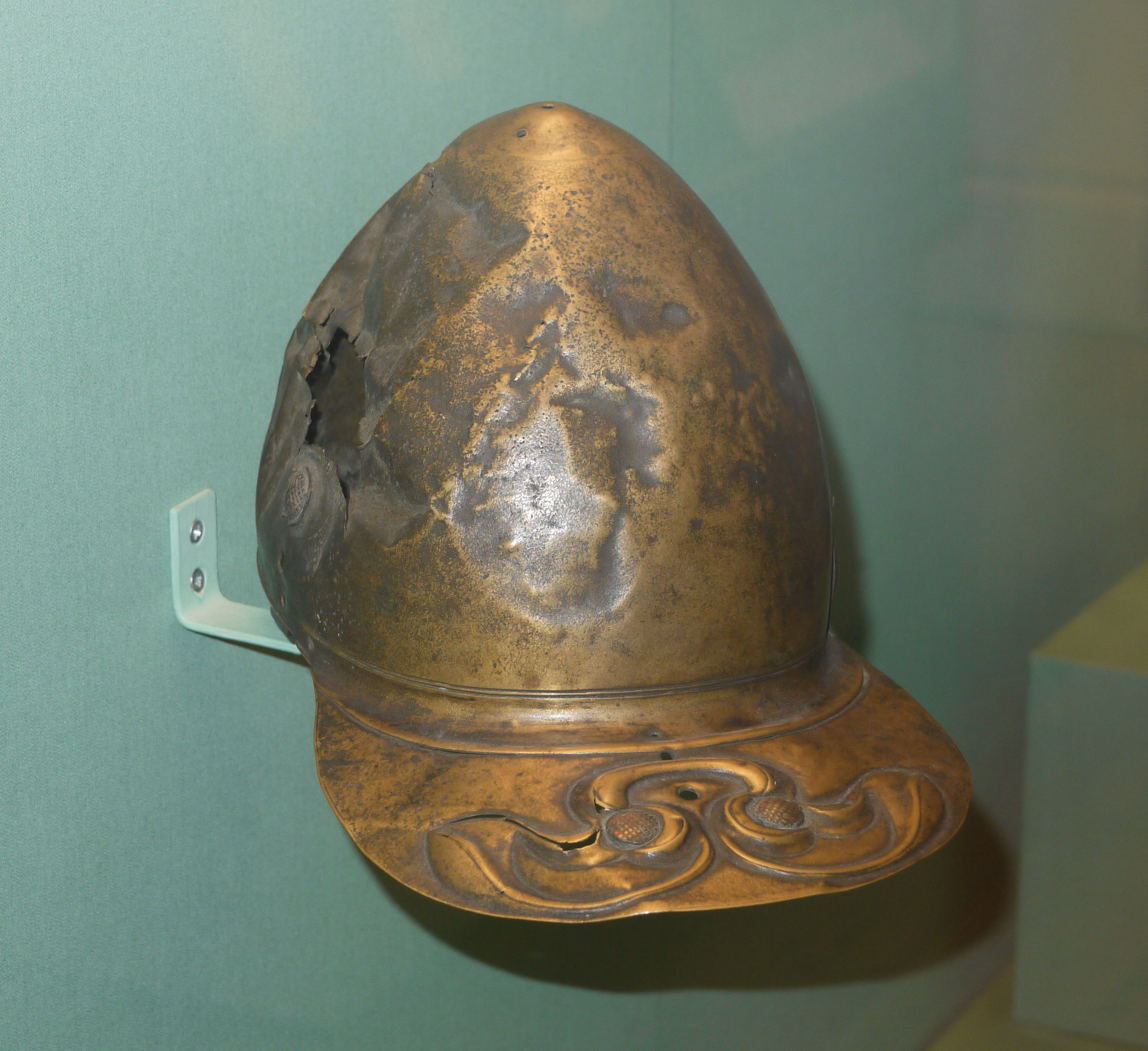
- In the British Museum
- Material: Bronze
- Created: Iron Age, 1st century AD
- Place: Northern Britain (?)
- Present location: Room 50, British Museum, London
- Registration: 1872,1213.2

The Meyrick Helmet is an Iron Age bronze peaked helmet, with La Tène style decoration, that is held at the British Museum in London. It is one of only four Iron Age helmets to have been discovered in Britain, the other three being the more famous Waterloo Helmet, the Canterbury Helmet and the North Bersted Warrior helmet. Unlike the Waterloo Helmet, which bears two cone-shaped horns, the Meyrick Helmet is hornless and appears to be based on a Roman model. Vincent Megaw, emeritus professor of archaeology at the University of Leicester, has conjectured that the helmet may have belonged to a British auxiliary fighting in the Roman army during the campaigns against the Brigantes in AD 71–74.

== Discovery ==
The provenance of the helmet is unknown, but on stylistic grounds it is thought likely that it comes from the north of England, in the area of Britain controlled by the Brigantes tribe. The helmet is first recorded as part of the collection of arms and armour accumulated by Sir Samuel Rush Meyrick (1783–1848), and so must have been discovered some time before 1848. It is possible that the helmet came from the Stanwick Hoard of about 140 bronze objects that was found some time between 1843 and 1845 near Stanwick Camp in North Yorkshire, which may have been the oppidum of the Brigantes. After Meyrick's death the helmet and other items of Iron Age armour, such as the Witham Shield, were left to his cousin, Lt. Colonel Augustus Meyrick, who disposed of them between 1869 and 1872. The helmet was purchased by Augustus Franks, an independently wealthy antiquarian who worked for the British Museum. Franks donated the helmet to the British Museum in 1872.

== Description ==
The helmet is considered to be a Celtic version of a Roman auxiliary helmet, combining a Roman shape with La Tène style decoration. It is in the shape of a conical cap with a peaked neck guard. It is made from a single sheet of bronze, possibly spun finished, and has repoussé decoration in the La Tène style, similar to that found on the Waterloo Helmet, on the neck guard and on the fragmentary side pieces. On the neck guard are two flat domed bosses with criss-cross grooves which would originally have held red glass enamel studs. There are holes on either side for attachment to a chin-strap or cheekpiece, and a hole at the top of the helmet for the attachment of a plumed top-knot. On the outer margin of the helmet are incised two strokes which could represent the Roman number "II".

== See also ==
- Waterloo Helmet
