= Canterbury helmet =

Iron Age helmet found in Kent, England

The Canterbury Helmet is an Iron Age helmet found in a field near Canterbury, Kent, England, in December 2012. Made of bronze, it is one of only a few helmets dating from the Iron Age to ever have been found in Britain. The helmet currently resides in the British Museum, and is undergoing conservation work. It was found by Mr Trevor Rogers, who found it together with an iron brooch and a pin, and it is thought to have contained a bag with cremated human remains.

== Construction ==
The helmet was made of sheet bronze, and was of the Coolus style, a type used by both Gallic Warriors and Roman Legionaries, with a bowl shape and a flared beck to protect the back of the head and neck. This type of helmet was common on the continent, but is not commonly seen in Britain, though this may simply be due to the lack of finds from this era.

== Context ==
It is unclear where exactly the helmet is from. It is thought by some historians that it may be the burial of a Roman soldier from Caesar's Invasions of Britain, or that it may be the helmet of a British mercenary who had served against the Romans in Gaul, and had adopted a Continental helmet style. Other historians and archaeologists believe it is simply a helmet inspired by Gallic designs. As the helmet was found in 2012, debate still rages about its nature and origin.

== See also ==
- Meyrick Helmet
- Waterloo Helmet
