= Wandsworth Shield =

Iron Age archaeological discovery found in London

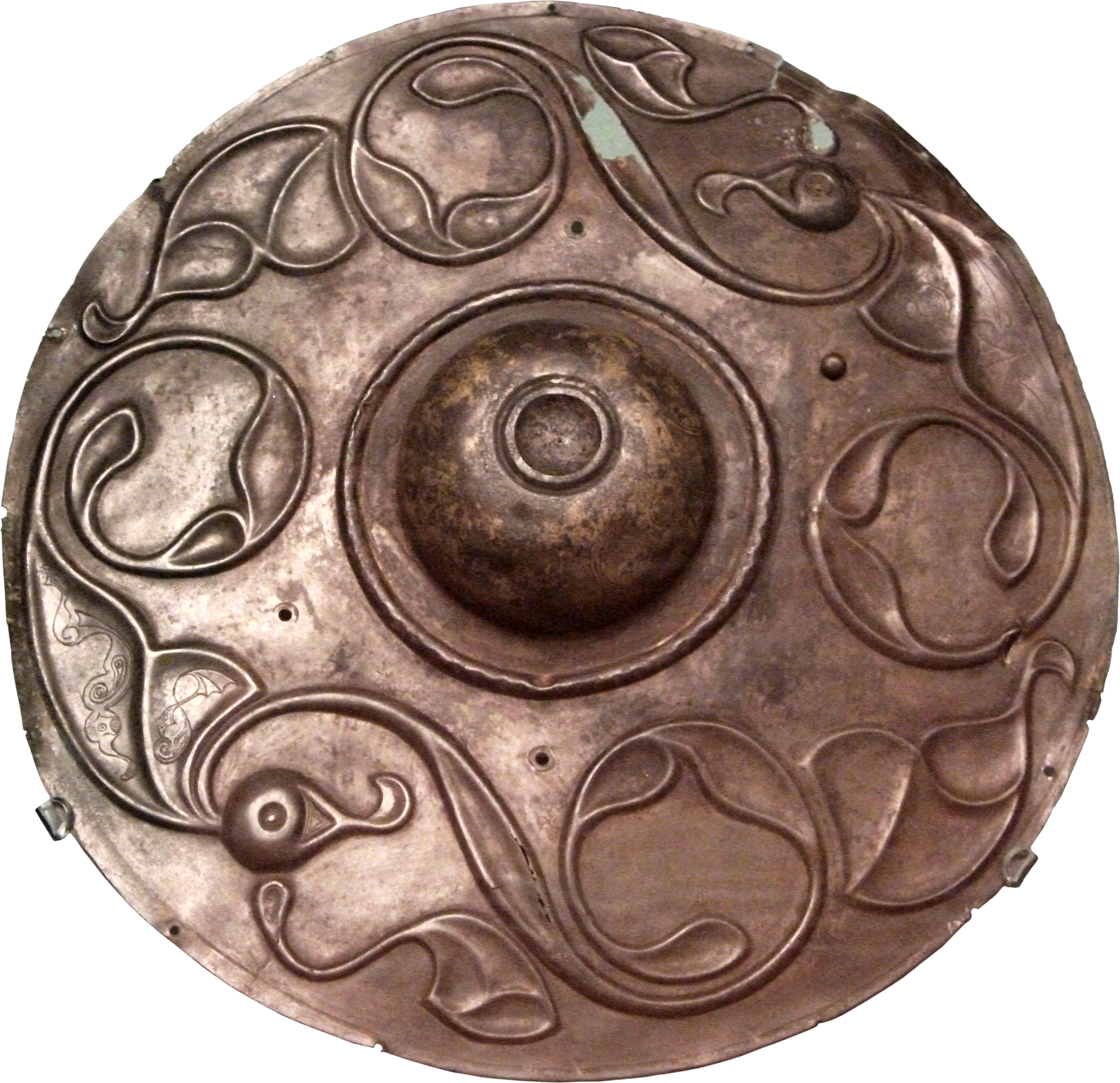
- On display in the British Museum
- Material: Bronze
- Size: Diameter: 33.0 cm
- Created: Iron Age, 2nd century BC
- Place: River Thames, London
- Present location: Room 50, British Museum, London
- Registration: 1858,1116.2 (Wandsworth Shield); 1858,1116.3 (Wandsworth Mask Shield)

The Wandsworth Shield is a circular bronze Iron Age shield boss or mount decorated in La Tène style which was found in the River Thames at Wandsworth in London sometime before 1849. Another incomplete bronze shield mount, sometimes called the Wandsworth Mask Shield was found at the same time. Both shield mounts are now held at the British Museum. The bold repoussé decoration on the Wandsworth Shield, comprising two birds with outstretched wings and long trailing tail feathers, has led Barry Cunliffe, Emeritus Professor of European Archaeology at the University of Oxford, to consider the shield to be "among the masterpieces of British Celtic art".

== Discovery ==
The circular bronze shield mount, another incomplete bronze shield mount, a bronze sword, and celt were found in the River Thames at Wandsworth during dredging operations in 1849 or earlier, and were presented to the Royal Archaeological Institute by William English in December 1849. English was a millwright who operated steam dredging machines on the Thames from 1808 until about 1850. The two shield mounts were donated to the British Museum by the Royal Archaeological Institute in 1858.

== Description ==
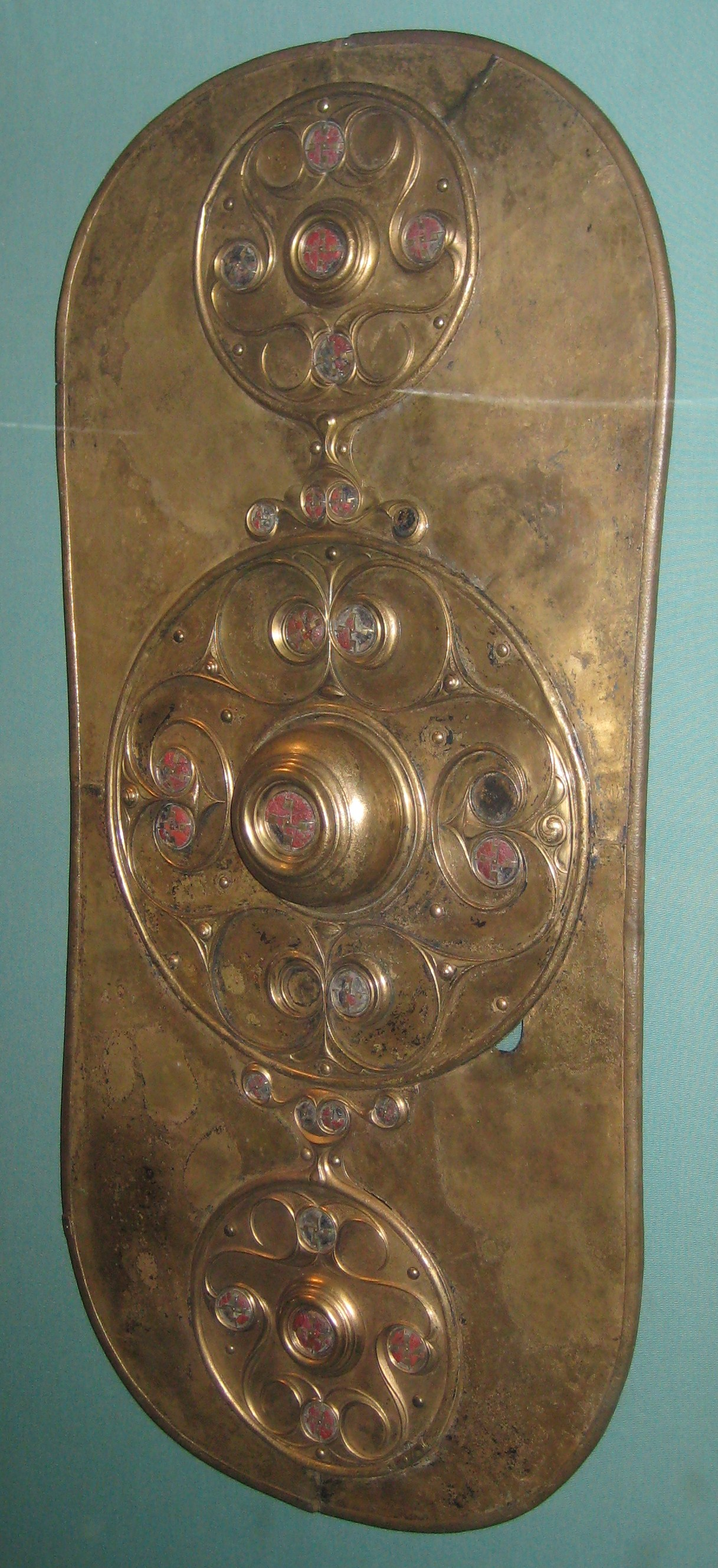
The Battersea Shield, showing a central boss that is similar to the Wandsworth Shield

The circular shield mount (Proto-Celtic *skētos (compare Breton skoed “shield”; Latin scūtum) comprises a central shield boss and an outer flange, 33 cm in diameter, and may be the central boss of an oblong shield similar to the Battersea Shield. The boss is ornamented with a curvilinear decoration in La Tène style comprising two almost identical bird patterns. There is a depression in the centre of the boss that would have originally held an ornamental stud made of enamel, as is also the case with the Battersea Shield. The surrounding flange is decorated with stylised designs of two large birds, with outstretched palmette wings and long trailing tail feathers, each a mirror image of the other. Further bird shapes are incised with a rocked graver technique on the wings of the two birds. The eye of each bird is marked with a depression in which there is a rivet that would originally have held a stud, possibly of Mediterranean coral. The bronze part of the shield would have been mounted on a wooden backing by six rivets, of which only one survives. This rivet extends 8 mm in length, indicating that the wooden backing to the shield would have been no more than 8 mm thick.

The incomplete bronze shield mount consists of a central boss, 11.85 cm in diameter, which transforms into a half-cylindrical spine at the top and bottom, one end broken and one end terminating in an anthropomorphic face. The surviving portion of the mount is 37.0 cm in length, and is similar to the boss and medial spine on the Witham Shield. The central boss is ornamented with repoussé work combined with a finely engraved spiral decoration, showing the heads of two ducks. The terminal face has three hairspring spirals engraved on the nose, and a row of triangles representing the teeth of the mouth. The surviving bronze mount would have been mounted on an oblong wooden shield with at least seven rivets. The length of the rivets indicates that the wooden backing would have been no more than 8 mm thick.

The circular shield mount is dated to the 2nd century BC, and the mask shield is dated to the later 3rd century BC. It has been conjectured that these two shields, as well as other Iron Age shields that have been found in rivers, such as the Battersea Shield and the Witham Shield, were votive offerings to the gods. Together with the Witham Shield, the style, especially of the engraving, is very close to that of the Torrs Pony-cap and Horns found in Scotland and now in the Museum of Scotland.

== See also ==
- Waterloo Helmet
