= Waterloo Helmet =

Celtic ceremonial helmet

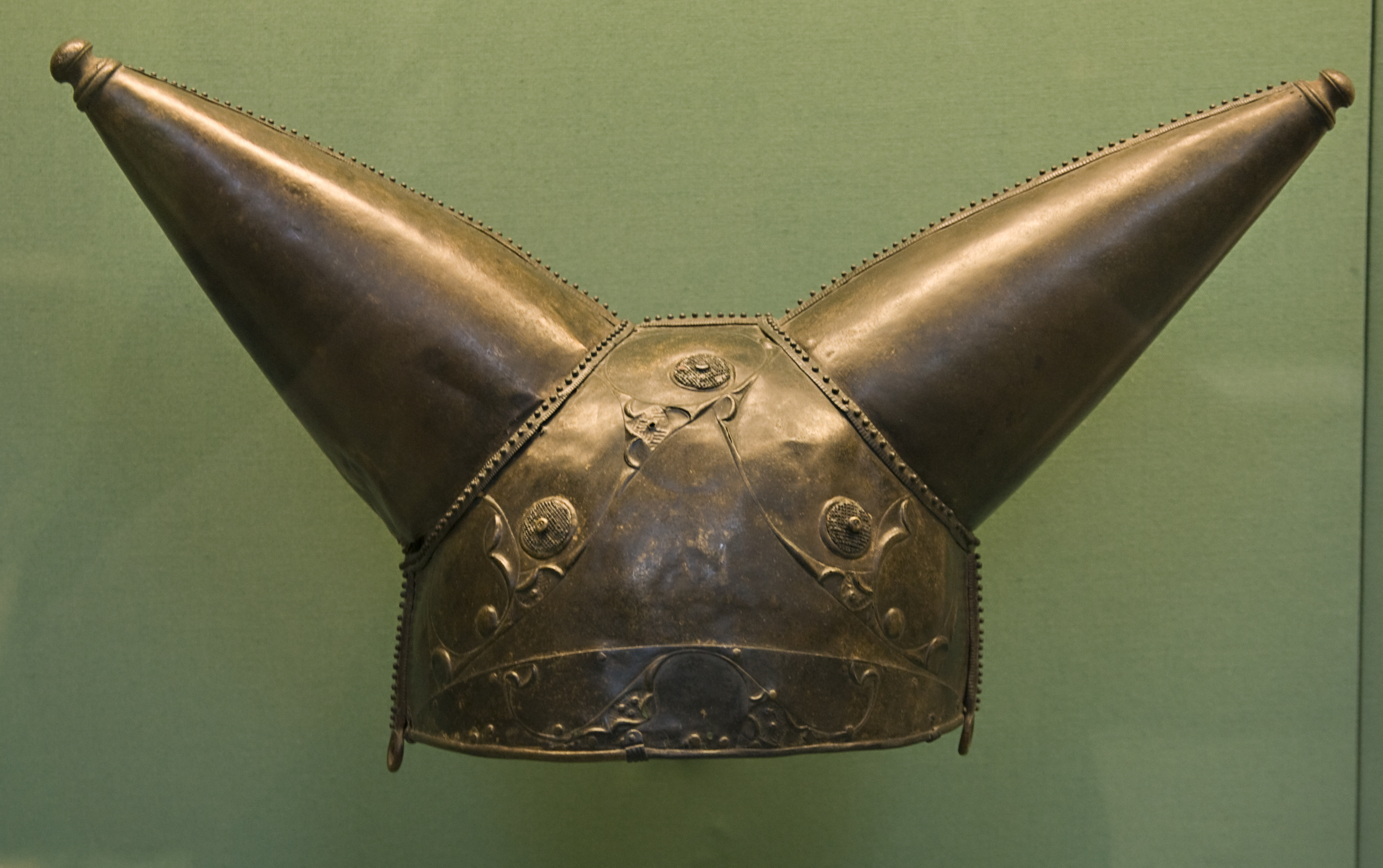
- On display in the British Museum
- Material: Bronze
- Size: Height: 24.2 cm Circumference: 58.5 cm
- Created: Iron Age, c.150–50 BC
- Discovered: 1868
- Place: River Thames, London
- Present location: Room 50, British Museum, London
- Registration: 1988,1004.1

The Waterloo Helmet (also known as the Waterloo Bridge Helmet) is a pre-Roman Celtic bronze ceremonial horned helmet with repoussé decoration in the La Tène style, dating to circa 150–50 BC, that was found in 1868 in the River Thames near Waterloo Bridge in London, England. It is now on display at the British Museum in London.

== Discovery ==
The helmet was dredged from the bed of the River Thames close to Waterloo Bridge in 1868. In March of the same year it was loaned to the British Museum by the Thames Conservancy. In 1988 its successor body, the Port of London Authority, donated the helmet to the British Museum.

== Description ==
The main part of the helmet is constructed from two sheets of bronze, one forming the front and one the back of the helmet, that are riveted together at the sides and top. A separate crescent-shaped bronze piece is riveted to the bottom of the front sheet, and two conical bronze horns with terminal knobs are riveted to the top of the helmet. A decorative strip with a row of rivets overlays the join between the front and back sheets, and goes around the base of the horns. At the end of the strip, on both sides of the helmet, is a ring fitting for a chin-strap or cheekpiece. There are a number of small holes around the bottom edge, which may have been used to attach a lining.

The helmet was decorated with six bronze studs, one of which is now missing, three on the front and three on the back. These have cross scores on them that suggest they were designed to hold red glass enamel studs, but these are no longer present.

There is also a repoussé decoration in the La Tène style on the front and back of the helmet. The design is similar to that on the Snettisham Great Torc.

== Purpose ==
Being made from thin bronze sheets, the helmet would have been too fragile for use in battle, and so it was probably intended to be used for ceremonial or parade purposes. In this respect it is similar to Iron Age bronze shields which would not have been effective against contemporary weapons and could only have been used for display purposes. Alternatively, it has been suggested that the helmet is too small for most adult males, and may have been worn by a wooden statue of a Celtic deity.

It is thought that the reason why the Waterloo Helmet and ceremonial bronze shields such as the Battersea Shield and Witham Shield were all found in rivers is that they were thrown into the river as votive offerings to the gods.

== Importance ==
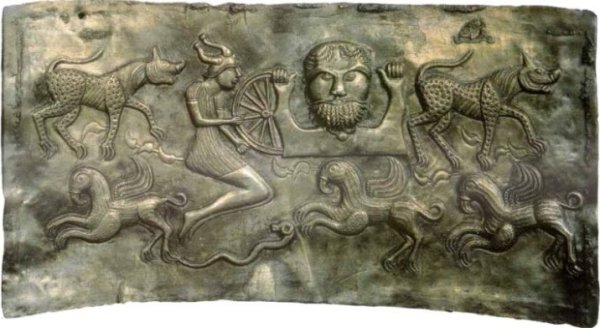
Plate C of the Gundestrup cauldron, showing a man in a horned helmet holding a wheel

The Waterloo Helmet is one of only three Iron Age helmets found in England and also the only horned helmet dating to the Iron Age anywhere in Europe. However, there are several Iron Age depictions of people wearing horned helmets from elsewhere in Europe. There are some carvings of Gauls wearing horned helmets on the triumphal arch at Orange, France, dating to c.55 BC, but these are very different from the Waterloo Helmet. Whereas the Waterloo Helmet has straight, conical horns with a broad base that are stylised representations of animal horns, the helmets depicted on the carvings at Orange show realistic, curved bull's horns between which is placed an upright wheel. Similar to the depictions on the triumphal arch of Orange is the image of a leaping figure wearing a horned helmet and holding a wheel on the Gundestrup cauldron from Denmark, dating to the 1st century BC. This helmet is of a different shape from the Waterloo Helmet, and the horns are curved like those at Orange, but like the Waterloo Helmet the horns of the helmet are not pointed, but fitted with terminal knobs. An Iron Age bas-relief at Brague, near Antibes in France, also shows people wearing horned helmets.

Despite the depictions of horned helmets on the triumphal arch of Orange and elsewhere, the Waterloo Helmet remains the only known example of an actual horned helmet from this period. Other Iron Age helmets, such as the Canterbury helmet and the Meyrick Helmet from northern Britain, are hornless. Nevertheless, influenced by the iconic features of the Waterloo Helmet, modern artistic interpretations of Iron Age people tend to show them wearing horned helmets. Miranda Aldhouse-Green, professor of archaeology at Cardiff University has comment that it is "unfortunate that it has found such a firm place in many popular reconstructions of British warriors".

== See also ==
- Canterbury helmet
- Battersea shield
- Wandsworth Shield
- Witham Shield
