= Bullion Stone =

Pictish stone at the Museum of Scotland

Coordinates: 55.946991°N 3.189183°W

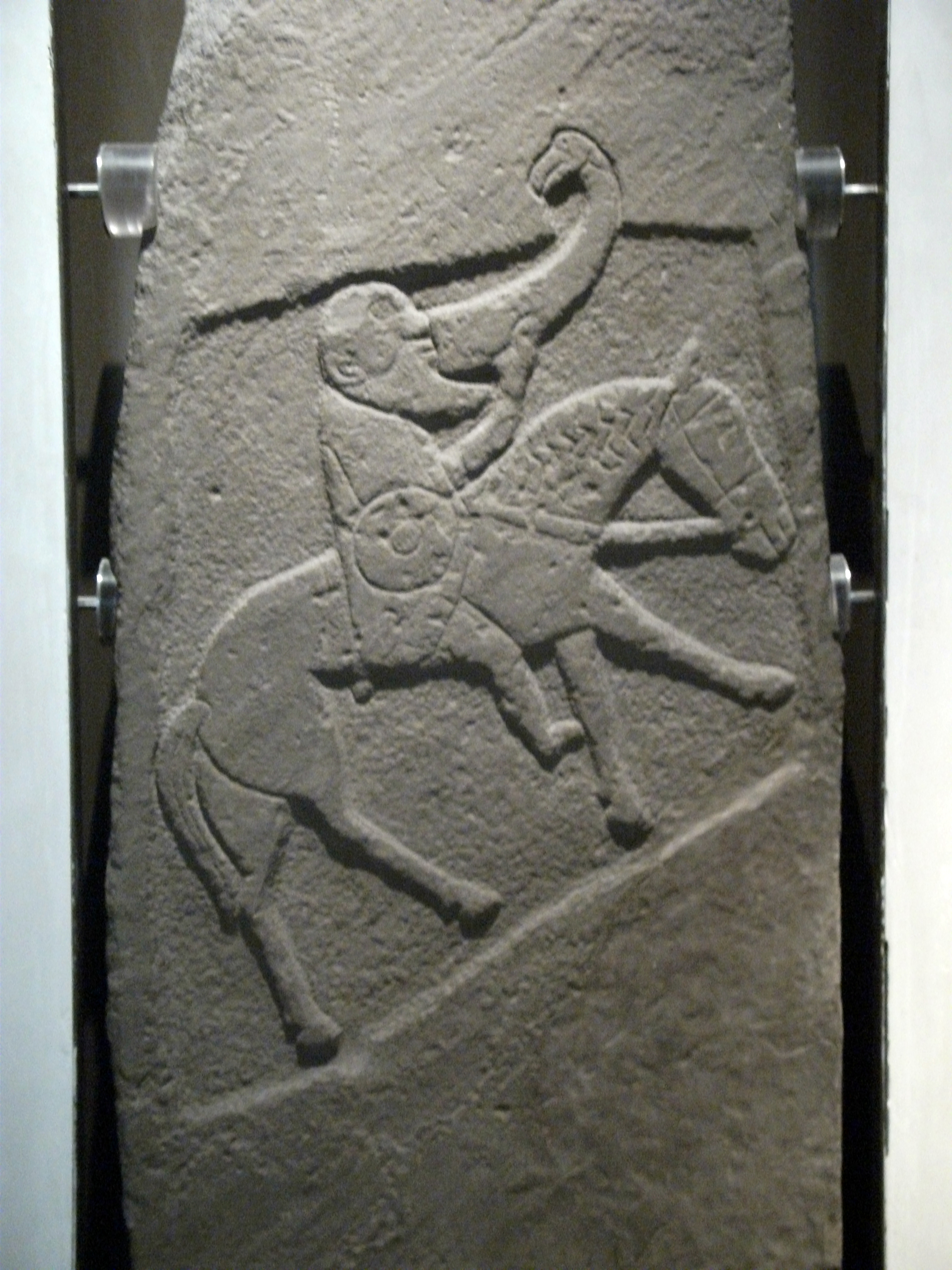

The Bullion Stone is a late carved Pictish stone, which is unusual in containing a figure; it dates to c. 900–950. It was discovered in 1933 at Bullion field, Invergowrie, during the construction of a road and is now located in the Museum of Scotland in Edinburgh. The image on the stone is unique amongst Pictish stones discovered thus far. It depicts a bald, bearded man on a weary horse, carrying a shield and drinking from a very large drinking horn with a bird's head terminal, a parallel that has been noted to the Torrs Horns, also in the museum, of nearly 1,000 years earlier.

== See also ==
- Pictish stones
- Stones of Scotland
