= Augustus Wollaston Franks =

British antiquarian and museum administrator (1826–1897)

Sir Augustus Wollaston Franks KCB FRS FSA
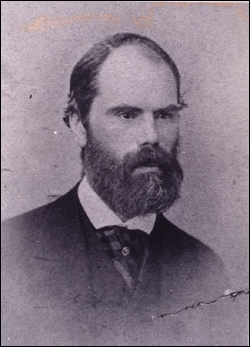
- Sir Augustus Wollaston Franks
- Born: 20 March 1826; Geneva, Switzerland
- Died: 21 May 1897 (aged 71)
- Education: Trinity College, Cambridge; Eton College
- Occupation: Museum administrator
- Known for: British antiquities; Royal Gold Cup acquisition Franks Casket

Sir Augustus Wollaston Franks KCB FRS FSA (20 March 1826 – 21 May 1897) was a British antiquarian and museum administrator. Franks was described by Marjorie Caygill, historian of the British Museum, as "arguably the most important collector in the history of the British Museum, and one of the greatest collectors of his age."

== Early life ==
Born at Geneva, he was elder son of Captain Frederick Franks, R.N., and of Frederica Anne, daughter of Sir John Saunders Sebright. His godfather was William Hyde Wollaston, a friend of his mother. His early years were spent mainly in Rome and Geneva. In September 1839 he went to Eton College, where he remained until 1843.

Franks then studied at Trinity College, Cambridge. As undergraduate he began his collection of brass rubbings, ultimately given to the Society of Antiquaries; was one of the founders of the Cambridge Architectural Society and an early member of the Cambridge Antiquarian Society; and was also one of the four student members of the Ray Club. On leaving Cambridge in 1849 Franks devoted his energies to the Royal Archæological Institute, then newly established, and laid the foundations of his knowledge of ancient and medieval art, in arranging its collections for annual congresses. In 1850 he was secretary of the first exhibition of medieval art held in the rooms of the Society of Arts.

== At the British Museum ==
In 1851, Franks was appointed assistant in the Department of Antiquities of the British Museum. The post was newly founded, and the brief was to develop a collection of "British antiquities". Franks in a 45-year career at the Museum went on to launch five distinct departments. David M. Wilson writes that "In many respects Franks was the second founder of the British Museum".

=== Administrator ===
At the British Museum, and as director of the Society of Antiquaries of London, an appointment he received in 1858, he made himself the leading authority in England on medieval antiquities of all descriptions, upon porcelain, glass, artefacts of anthropological interest, and works of art later than the Classical period.

In 1866, British and medieval antiquities, together with the ethnographic collections, were formed into a separate department under his superintendence, as Keeper of British and Mediaeval Antiquities and Ethnography. The Christy collection of ethnography in Victoria Street, London, was also under his care before its incorporation into the British Museum collections. He became vice-president and ultimately president of the Society of Antiquaries; and in 1878 he declined the principal librarianship (then the title of the executive head of the British Museum).

Franks was a member (No152) of the Roxburghe Club 1894-1897 and elected a member of the American Philosophical Society in 1895.

Franks retired on his seventieth birthday in 1896.

=== Acquisitions ===
In 1855 Franks was responsible for acquiring for the museum the finest items from the collection of Ralph Bernal, the Liberal politician and collector, including the outstanding Lothair Crystal. In 1892 he succeeded in raising the £8,000 needed to buy the Royal Gold Cup; "to Franks this was his greatest acquisition, and the one of which he was most proud". He had temporarily had to fund the purchase with £5,000 of his own money.

Towards the end of his career, he wrote:

I think I may fairly say that I have created the department of which I am now Keeper, and at a very moderate cost to the country. When I was appointed to the Museum in 1851 the scanty collections out of which the department has grown occupied a length of 154 feet of wall cases, and 3 or 4 table cases. The collections now occupy 2250 feet in length of wall cases, 90 table cases and 31 upright cases, to say nothing of the numerous objects placed over the cases or on walls.

Franks used personal influence on behalf of the Museum to help in the acquisition of collections. This he applied in the cases of Felix Slade, John Henderson, Lady Fellows for the collection of Sir Charles Fellows, William Burges and Octavius Morgan.

=== Personal collecting ===
Franks had a substantial personal fortune, which he used to build up some remarkable personal collections in parallel with his museum work on acquisitions. Though this activity was as an independent collector, it was of benefit also to the holdings of the British Museum, either in the short or longer term. It was largely devoted to the collection of ceramics and precious objects of medieval art; it also included many items from the Oxus Treasure, and Franks built up that side of his collection through dealers in India and by purchase from Alexander Cunningham.

Franks was also an authority on classical art, especially Roman remains in Britain. He set up an exhibition of his Asian ceramics, mainly Chinese porcelain, at the Bethnal Green Museum in 1876 in conjunction with the Science and Art Department of the Commottee of Council on Education at South Kensington. In his catalogue's second edition published by Eyre & Spottiswoode in 1878 Franks explained in the preface he had since added Japanese wares to make the collection more complete. He collected netsuke and tsuba from Japan, finger rings and drinking vessels. He was interested too in bookplates and playing-cards, of both of which he formed important collections; the friendship of John Warren, 3rd Baron de Tabley led him to bookplates, and he completed the reference work of Charlotte Elizabeth Schreiber on playing cards.

Franks' great-grandmother, Sarah Knight, was a cousin of Richard Payne Knight, another wealthy bachelor benefactor of the British Museum. Augustus blamed his obsessive collecting on his genes. In a manuscript account of his life, which was discovered in 1983, Franks began, "Collecting is a hereditary disease, and I fear incurable."

== Death and legacy ==
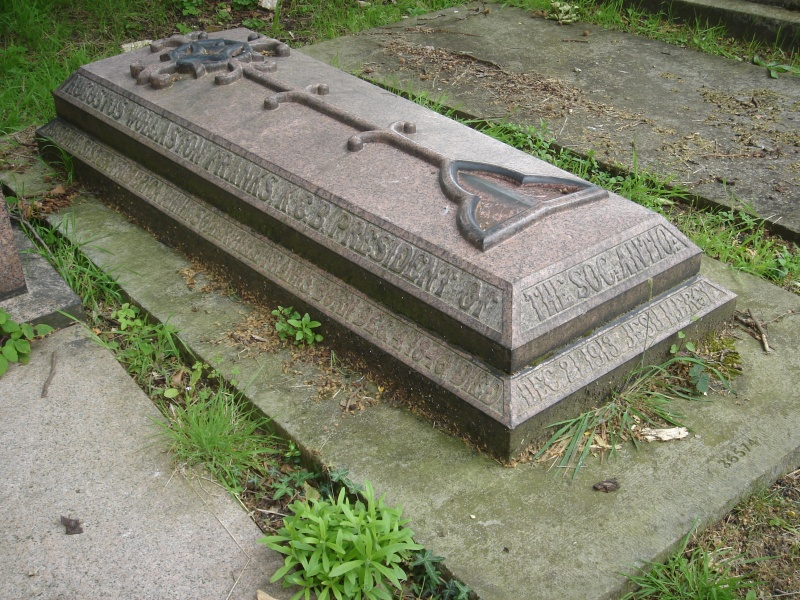
Funerary monument, Kensal Green Cemetery, London

Franks died 21 May 1897, and was buried at Kensal Green Cemetery, London. Most of the items in his collections became the property of the nation, by bequest at his death, where they had not been donations in his lifetime. Franks purchased over 20,000 important objects for the British Museum's collections.

One of his best known donations was the ninth-century ivory Franks Casket from Northumbria, with its runic inscriptions. It had been dismissed as 'some Ancient carvings in ivory', and turned down by the Museum's Trustees in 1858 when offered to them for 100 guineas. In 1867, Franks gave the casket to the British Museum as a gift.

In the case of the collection of Samuel Rush Meyrick, of arms and armour, Franks failed to persuade George Ward Hunt to purchase it complete for the nation when Augustus W. H. Meyrick put it up for sale around 1871. The Meyrick Collection went to auction and was broken up, but Franks did buy and then donate items such as the Meyrick Helmet.

When the British Museum was considering buying the ceramics collection of Sir Andrew Fountaine and his heirs, which came onto the market in 1884, Franks eased the deal by matching the money required with purchases of his own.

== Works ==
He wrote numerous memoirs on archaeological subjects. His major publications were:

- ‘Book of Ornamental Glazing Quarries,’ London, 1849.
- ‘Examples of Ornamental Art in Glass and Enamel,’ 1858.
- ‘Himyaritic Inscriptions from Southern Arabia,’ 1863.
- ‘Catalogue of Oriental Porcelain and Pottery,’ 1876 and 1878.
- ‘Japanese Pottery,’ 1880. 2nd edition, 1906
- ‘Catalogue of a Collection of Continental Porcelain,’ 1896.

He also edited John Mitchell Kemble's Horæ Ferales (1863); and Edward Hawkins's Medallic Illustrations of British History, 1885. In writing about British Celtic art he introduced the term "Late Celtic period", but its application proved contentious, and was considered somewhat misleading in the European picture of Celtic art.
