= Marjorie Caygill =

British historian

Marjorie Lancaster Caygill OBE FSA (born 1940) is a British historian, specialising in the history of the British Museum.

== Career ==
In the early 1970s, Caygill was a Research Assistant at the Institute of Commonwealth Studies. She joined the British Museum in 1973 as a Research Assistant in the Secretariat and became Assistant to the Director in 1978. She was elected a Fellow of the Society of Antiquaries in 1984, and received the OBE in the 1993 New Year Honours. She retired in 2004, and in 2008 became a Fellow of the Centre for Anthropology at the British Museum.

== Selected publications ==
=== Books ===
- Treasures of the British Museum (British Museum Press, 2009) ISBN 978-0714121642
- Curious things of every kind : the British Museum book of poetry (British Museum Press, 2008) ISBN 978-0714150710 (with John Curtis)
- Flowers (British Museum Press, 2006) ISBN 978-0714150444
- Winter: A Companion (British Museum Press, 2004) ISBN 978-0714150338
- The British Museum. 250 Years (British Museum Press, 2003) ISBN 978-0714127866 (with Neil MacGregor)
- Peoples of the Past. British Museum Diary 2003 (British Museum Press, 2003) ISBN 978-0714127736
- The Story of the British Museum (British Museum Press, 2002) ISBN 978-0714127729
- The British Museum Reading Room (British Museum, 2000) ISBN 978-0861599851
- Building the British Museum (British Museum Press, 1999) ISBN 978-0714121642 (with Christopher Date)
- The British Museum A-Z Companion (British Museum Press, 1999) ISBN 978-0714121437
- A.W. Franks: Nineteenth-century Collecting and the British Museum (British Museum Press, 1997) ISBN 978-0714117638 (edited with John F. Cherry)
- A Survey of Visitors to the British Museum (1992-3) (British Museum, 1994) ISBN 978-0861591015 (with M.N. Leese)
- A Survey of Visitors to the British Museum (1982-1983) (British Museum Occasional Paper 64, 1986) ISBN 978-0861590643 (with Peter H. Mann and Geoffrey House)
- Treasures of the British Museum (British Museum Press, 1985) ISBN 978-0714120331
- Economic Aspects of the Viking Age (British Museum Occasional Paper 30, 1981) ISBN 978-0861590308 (with David M. Wilson)
- Community in the making: aspects of Britain's role in the development of professional education in the commonwealth (University of London Institute of Commonwealth Studies, 1972) ISBN 978-0902499164 (with Terence James Johnson)

=== Articles and chapters in books ===
- "Sloane's catalogue and the arrangement of his collections" in Alison Walker, Arthur MacGregor and Michael Hunter (eds), From Books to Bezoars (2012)
- "Sir Hans Sloane and his museum", BM Magazine: the journal of the British Museum Society, 2003.

=== Online courses ===
- Creating a Great Museum: Early Collectors and The British Museum (Fathom online-learning site): (Session 1) Sir Hans Sloane, Founder of The British Museum; (2) The Magna Carta, Lindisfarne Gospels and Other Treasures; (3) Rare Birds: Female Collectors and The British Museum; (4) The Rothschilds; (5) Quantity versus Quality among the Collectors
