= Battersea Shield =

Celtic archaeological discovery

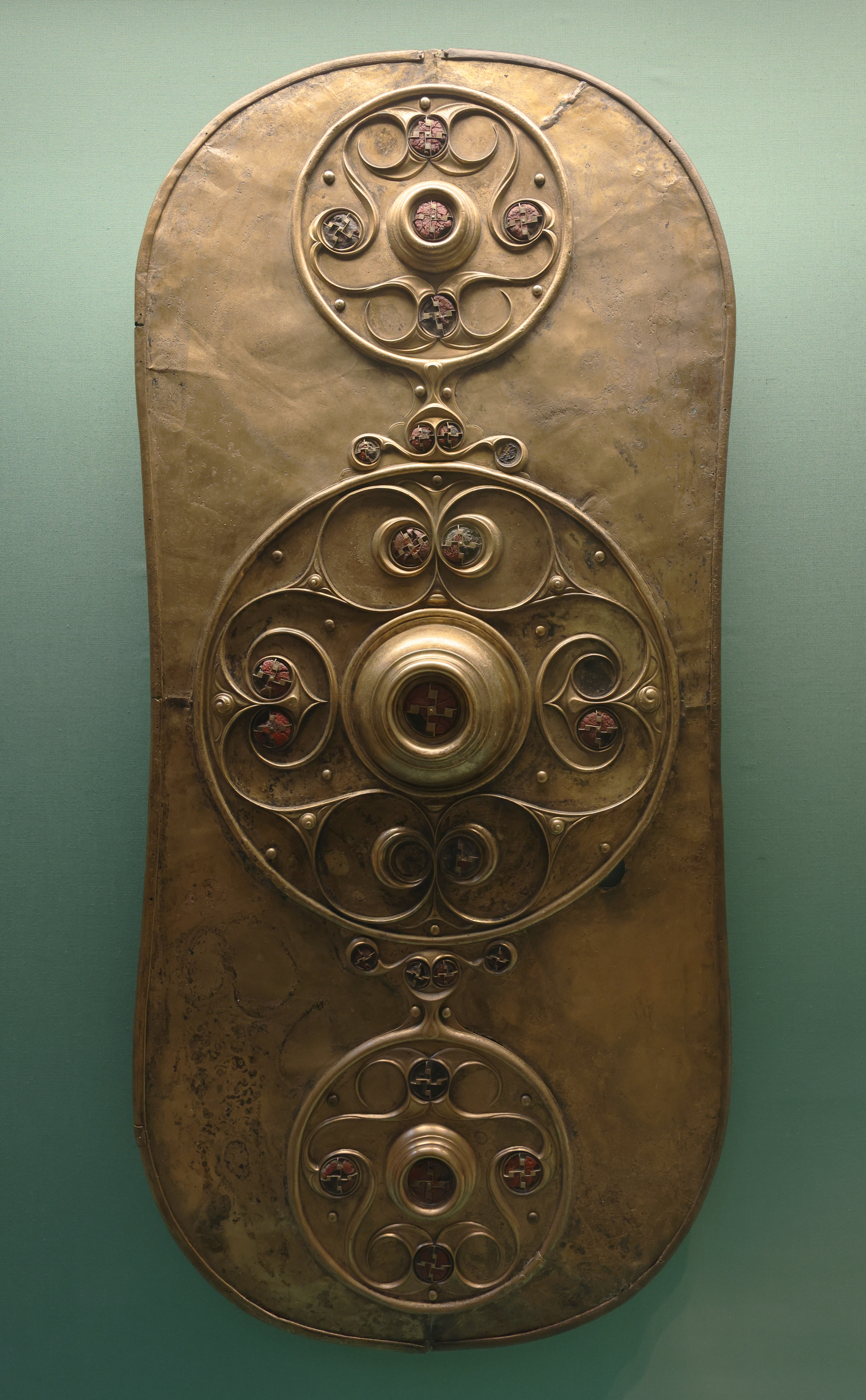
- On display in the British Museum
- Material: Bronze
- Size: Length: 77.7 cm Width: 34.1–35.7 cm Weight: 3.4 kg
- Created: Iron Age, c.350–50 BC
- Place: River Thames, London
- Present location: Room 50, British Museum, London
- Registration: 1857,0715.1

The Battersea Shield is one of the most significant pieces of ancient Celtic art found in Britain. It is a sheet bronze covering of a (now vanished) wooden shield decorated in La Tène style. The shield is on display in the British Museum, and a replica is housed in the Museum of London.

== History ==
The Battersea Shield is dated by the museum to c. 350–50 BC, though later dates up to the early first century AD had previously been suggested, usually in the later part of this range; Miranda Aldhouse-Green is typical in using "2nd-1st century BC" in 1996. It was dredged from the bed of the River Thames at Battersea in London in 1857, during excavations for the predecessor of Chelsea Bridge. In the same area, workers found large quantities of Roman and Celtic weapons and skeletons in the riverbed, leading many historians to conclude that the area was the site of Julius Caesar's crossing of the Thames during the 54 BC invasion of Britain, although it is now thought that the shield was a votive offering, which probably predates the invasion.

== Description ==
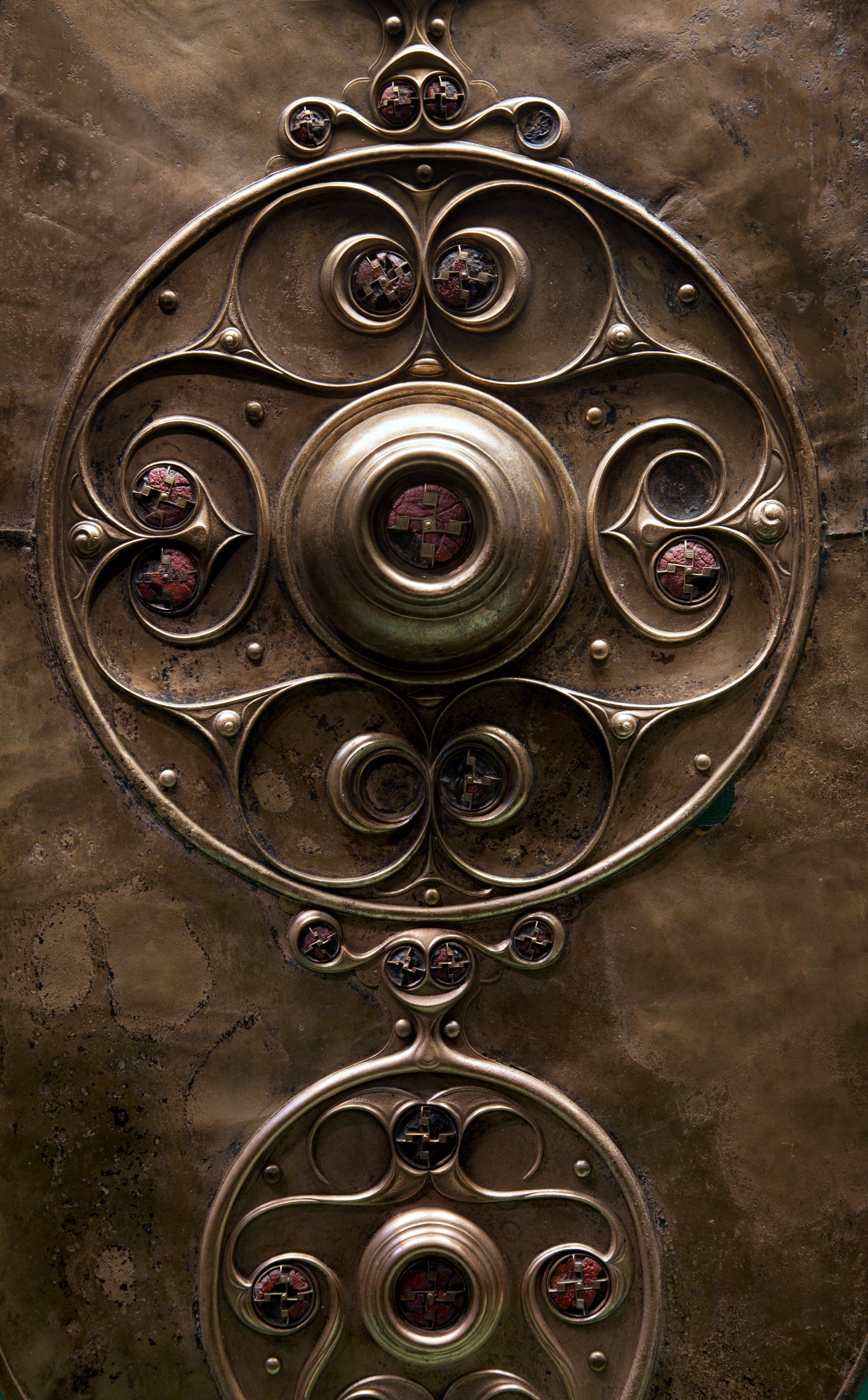
Battersea Shield closeup

The Battersea Shield is made of several different pieces, held together by rivets concealed under the decorative elements. It is decorated with repoussé decoration, engraving, and enamel. The decoration is in the typically Celtic La Tène style, consisting of circles and spirals. There are 27 small round compartments in raised bronze with red cloisonné enamel; the bronze within the compartment forms a sort of swastika, thought to have been associated with good luck and also "solar energy". This symbol was known as the whirling sun in ancient times. Enamel was a Celtic speciality, and reflects the use of red Mediterranean coral inlays in other British Celtic artefacts, such as the Witham Shield, and here may perhaps be considered as an imitation of imported coral, though the use of enamel allows a more elaborate design. Some scholars have read a reversible human face into the decoration at the points where the smaller circles link to the larger one.

The bronze sheet is said by archaeologists to be too thin to have offered effective protection in combat, and shows no signs of battle damage. It is therefore believed that the shield was cast into the river as a votive offering, and made either as a "parade piece" or status symbol, or specifically for votive offering. Nothing remains of the plain wooden or leather shield to which the surviving metal plate would have been fixed.

== In popular culture ==
The shield plate inspired the name of a 2004 EP, Battersea Shield, by electronic bands The Orb and Meat Beat Manifesto, which was sold in an embossed tin based on the design of the Battersea Shield, instead of a standard jewel case.

== See also ==
- Witham Shield
- Wandsworth Shield
- Waterloo Helmet
