= Witham Shield =

Iron Age shield discovered in Lincolnshire, England

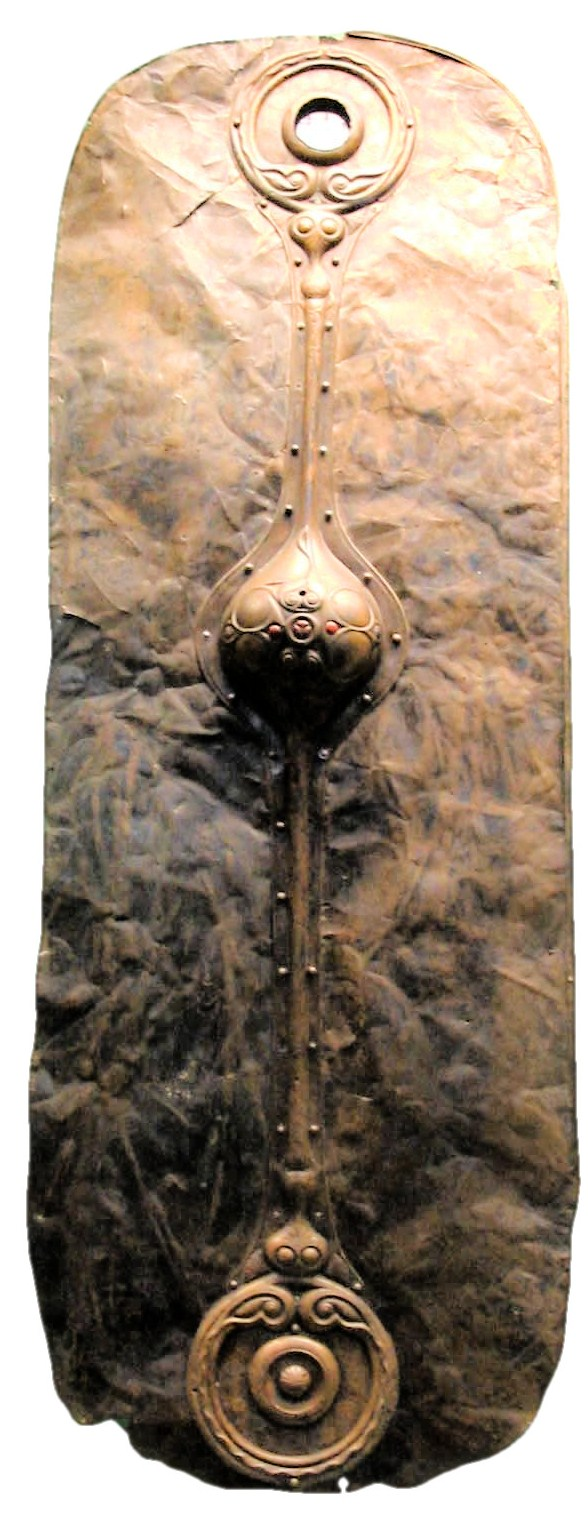
- Material: Bronze
- Size: 1.13 m long
- Created: 400-300 BC
- Discovered: in the River Witham near Lincoln
- Present location: British Museum, London
- Registration: 1872,1213.1

The Witham Shield is an Iron Age decorative bronze shield facing of La Tène style, dating from about the 4th century BC. The shield was discovered in the River Witham in the vicinity of Washingborough and Fiskerton in Lincolnshire, England in 1826. Further excavations at a nearby site have revealed posts interpreted as the foundation for a causeway, as well as artefacts including a sword, spears and part of a human skull with a sword fragment lodged within. The shield is now in the British Museum.

== Appearance ==
The Witham Shield is an example of the style of Celtic art known as La Tène. The bronze facings show evidence of having been reworked. The most noticeable feature is the central dome which would have been required for functional reasons as it allowed the owner to hold the shield close to its centre of gravity. Originally a leather silhouette of a long-legged wild boar would have been riveted to the shield around the central dome, as indicated by small rivet holes and staining of the shield. The pattern of discolouration was very clear when the shield was recovered from the River Witham (see 1863 drawing below). Although it is still possible to see the discolouration under certain lighting conditions, the boar design is no longer easy to make out. The boar may have been a tribal emblem or represented the prowess of the shield's owner, but could also have been a representation of the Celtic god Moccus. The shield also has a number of birds and animals incorporated into the design. The roundels at each end are inspired by the heads of birds, which are supported by horses with wings for ears. Birds similar to crested grebes are engraved on the central spine and this completes the engraving work elsewhere.

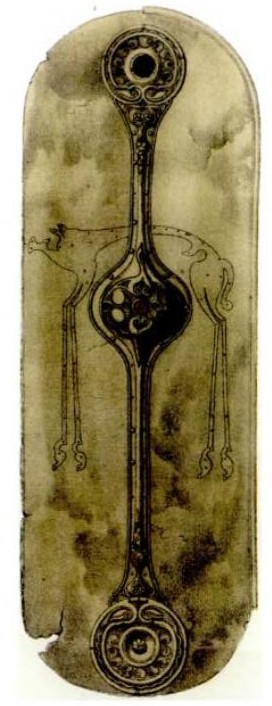
Drawing of the shield made in 1863 by Orlando Jewitt in John Kemble's book Horae Ferales, clearly showing the long-legged boar

== Construction ==
The shield was made principally from wood, now perished, to a design later known as a "Gaulish Shield" that originated in the seventh century BC. What remains is an almost complete facing that had been made to cover its surface. The sheeting is 0.2-0.3 mm thick and was designed to be applied to a wooden backing estimated at 8 mm thick. There are two main sheets that meet at the midpoint of the shield. Each of these sheets is just over one metre long. The join is not neat, and it is hidden from view by a covering strip. The shield is decorated with a central spindle boss, on which are pieces of red coral that are thought to have come from the Mediterranean area.

== Importance ==
The shield has been described as a "tour de force" of beaten bronze work. There are no other complete bronze facings that survive in Europe. This is partially due to their rarity, as Celtic shields were normally constructed from unsheathed wood. The idea of covering a shield with bronze may indicate Greek and Etruscan influence. The shield is comparable with other shields found in Britain dating from the same period, such as the Chertsey Shield and the Battersea Shield which were also found in rivers.

== Ownership ==
The shield entered the collection of Sir Samuel Rush Meyrick (1783–1848), a noted collector of arms and armour, and after his death the shield and other items of Iron Age armour were left to his cousin, Lt. Colonel Augustus Meyrick, who disposed of them between 1869 and 1872. The shield was purchased by Augustus Franks, an independently wealthy antiquarian who worked for the British Museum. In 1872 Franks presented the shield to the British Museum, one of over 20,000 objects that he donated to the museum during his lifetime or by bequest at his death. [Witham Shield - BM registration number - 1872,1213.1]

== Related finds ==
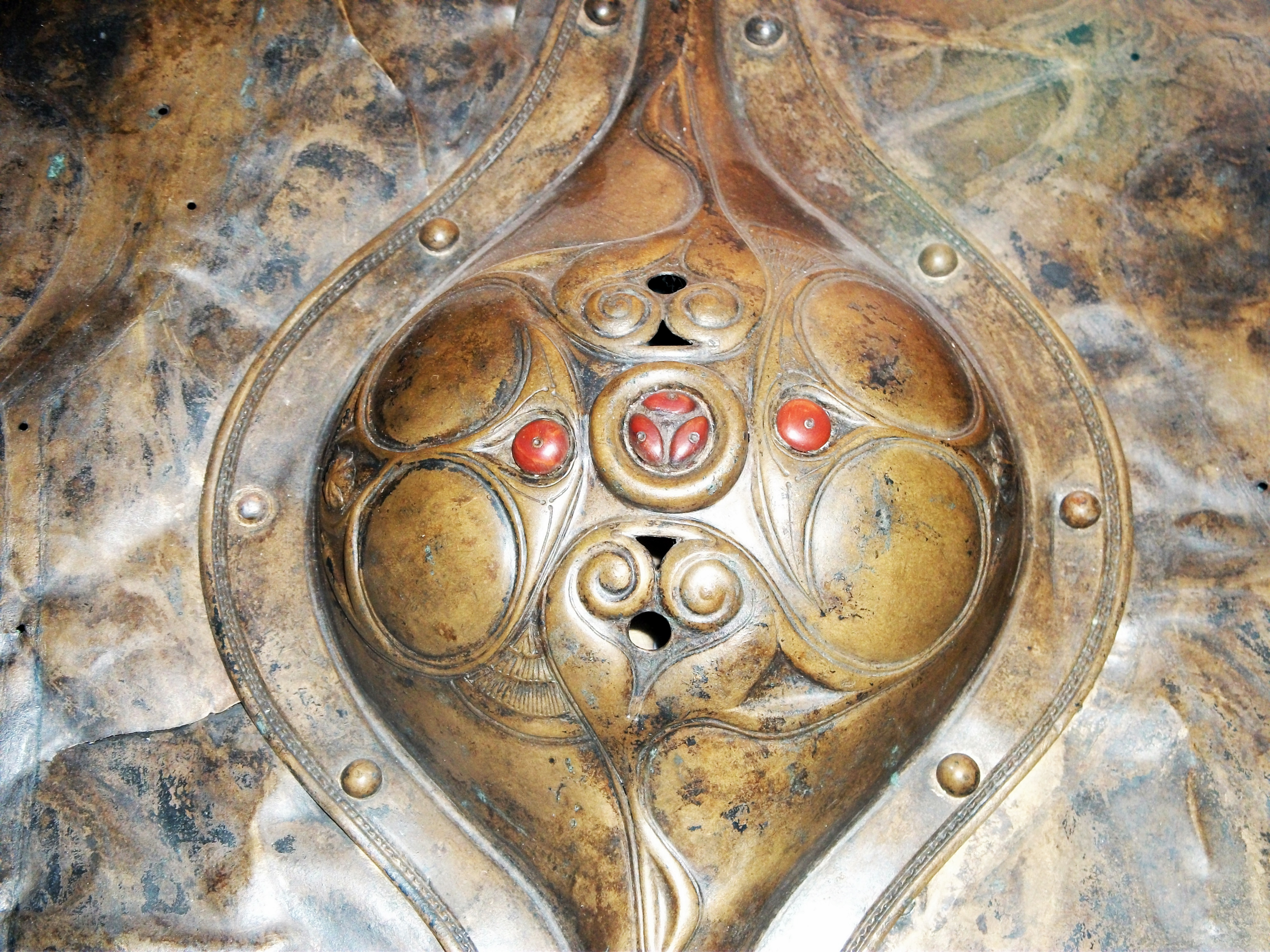
Detail of the central boss

An unusual triple headed dress pin was also found in 1826. This pin set was also found in the River Witham near Fiskerton. This is described as the only surviving set of triple dress pins and has been dated as 8th century and Anglo-Saxon. The pin set is also held in the British Museum.

In the 20th century a series of posts were found together with an early to mid Iron Age sword when a dyke was being cleaned near Fiskerton, near where the Witham Shield had been found. Excavations in 1981 revealed the posts to be a wooden causeway which dendrochronologists dated to a period between 457 and 300 BC. It appeared to have been repaired and added to every eighteen years or so during that period, even though the construction and maintenance of a walkway on such a scale at that time would have been a major feat of engineering. Hundreds of artifacts were also found around the causeway, including eleven spears, six swords, woodworking and metalworking tools, as well as part of a human skull which had a crescent-shaped chop mark, probably inflicted by a sword; this injury is unlikely to have killed the man.

Twenty years later, during further excavations at the site, more sections of the causeway were dug out, some of them containing posts several metres long, plus a complete spear, a currency bar, a sword, a dagger and some bronze fittings, all of which appeared to have been deliberately damaged before their burial. The most important discovery was two Iron Age votive boats. One of these boats, as well as other artifacts from the site, can be seen at The Collection in Lincoln. The area around the site of the causeway was opened as a nature reserve managed by the Lincolnshire Wildlife Trust in 2006.

== See also ==
- Battersea shield
- Wandsworth Shield
- Waterloo Helmet
- Keshcarrigan Bowl
