= Otto I of Oldenburg =

Otto I, Count of Oldenburg (born ca. 1175; died 1251) was Count of Oldenburg from 1209.

== Life ==
His father was Maurice, Count of Oldenburg who died in 1209, whereupon Otto succeeded to the title along with his brother Christian II, Count of Oldenburg.

He participated in the Stedinger Crusade in 1234. In so doing he won Moorriem, Holle, and Elsfleth from Stedingen and freed himself from the archiepiscopal sovereignty.

He also waged war on County of Hoya and on the Bishopric of Münster, the latter on a dispute over fief.

In 1244, he endowed Menslage-Börstel Monastery.

== Marriage and issue ==
He was married to Mechthild von Woldenberg with whom he had a daughter, Salome, who married Gerbert, Count of Stotel. With the death of his son Heinrich in 1255, this line became extinct.

== Literature ==
- Hans Friedl, Wolfgang Günther, Hilke Günther-Arndt, Heinrich Schmidt (Hrsg.): Biographisches Handbuch zur Geschichte des Landes Oldenburg, Oldenburg 1992, ISBN 3-89442-135-5
