= Belluno Treasure =

Treasure trove found in Belluno, Italy

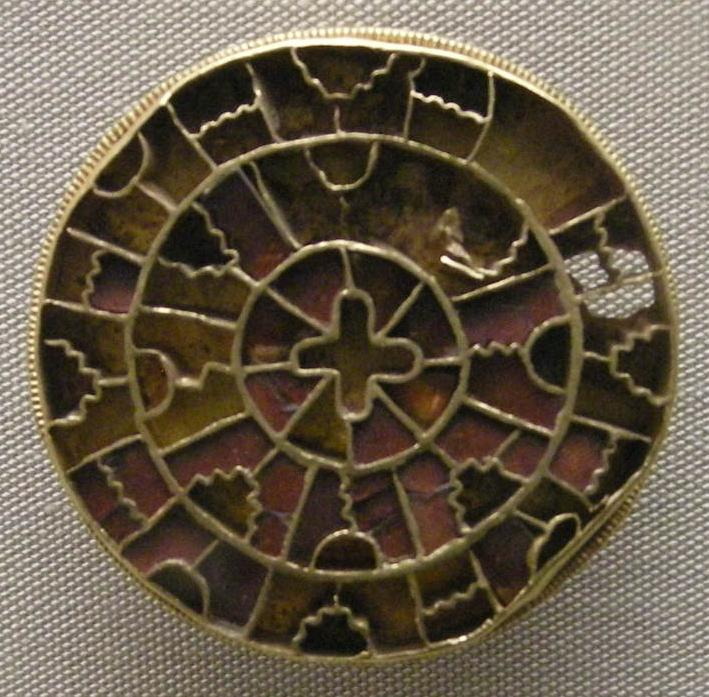
- Disc brooch from the Belluno Treasure displayed in the British Museum
- Material: Gold and precious stones
- Size: 4.5 cm diameter (brooch)
- Created: 6th-7th Centuries AD
- Period/culture: Lombardic
- Present location: British Museum
- Identification: AF.529

The Belluno Treasure is an important Lombardic hoard found at Belluno, Italy in the nineteenth century that has been part of the British Museum's collection since 1897.

== Discovery ==
The hoard was apparently found in a grave near the town of Belluno in the region of Veneto, northern Italy. Dating to the late 6th or early 7th centuries AD, the rich grave group probably belonged to a female member of the Lombardic court. It was later purchased by the curator and philanthropist Augustus Franks, who bequeathed it to the British Museum in 1897.

== Description ==
The Belluno Treasure is largely composed of gold and gem-encrusted jewellery. The style of decoration from the hoard reflect contemporary fashions in the Mediterranean. It includes two gold cross pendants (one with punched ornamentation), a gold and garnet cloisonné disc brooch, a finger-ring, a gold pin with a terminus in the form of a hand (which may have once held a pearl), and gold beads.

== Gallery ==
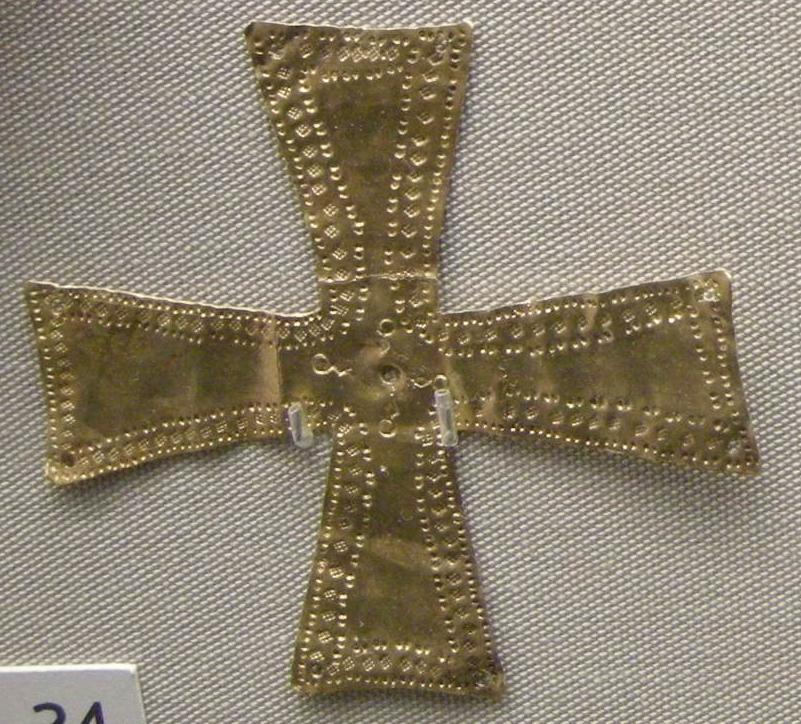
Gold cross, which indicates that the person buried was Christian

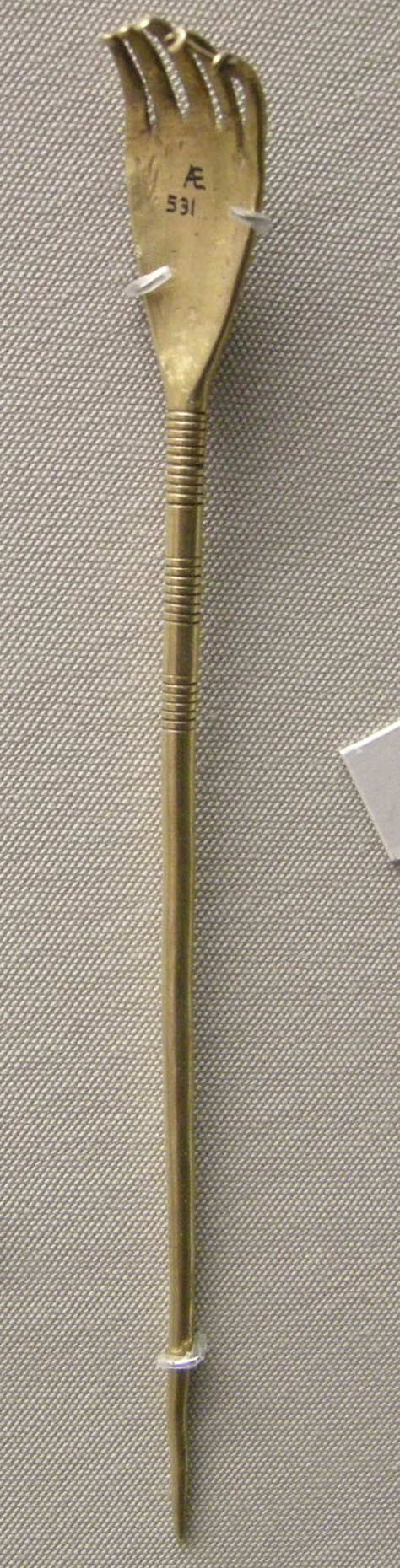
Gold pin with terminus in the shape of a small hand

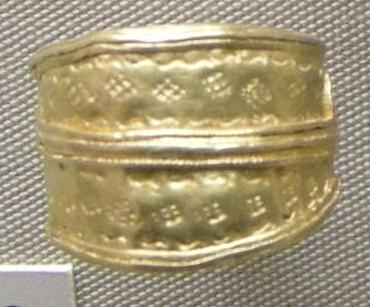
Finger ring with punched decoration

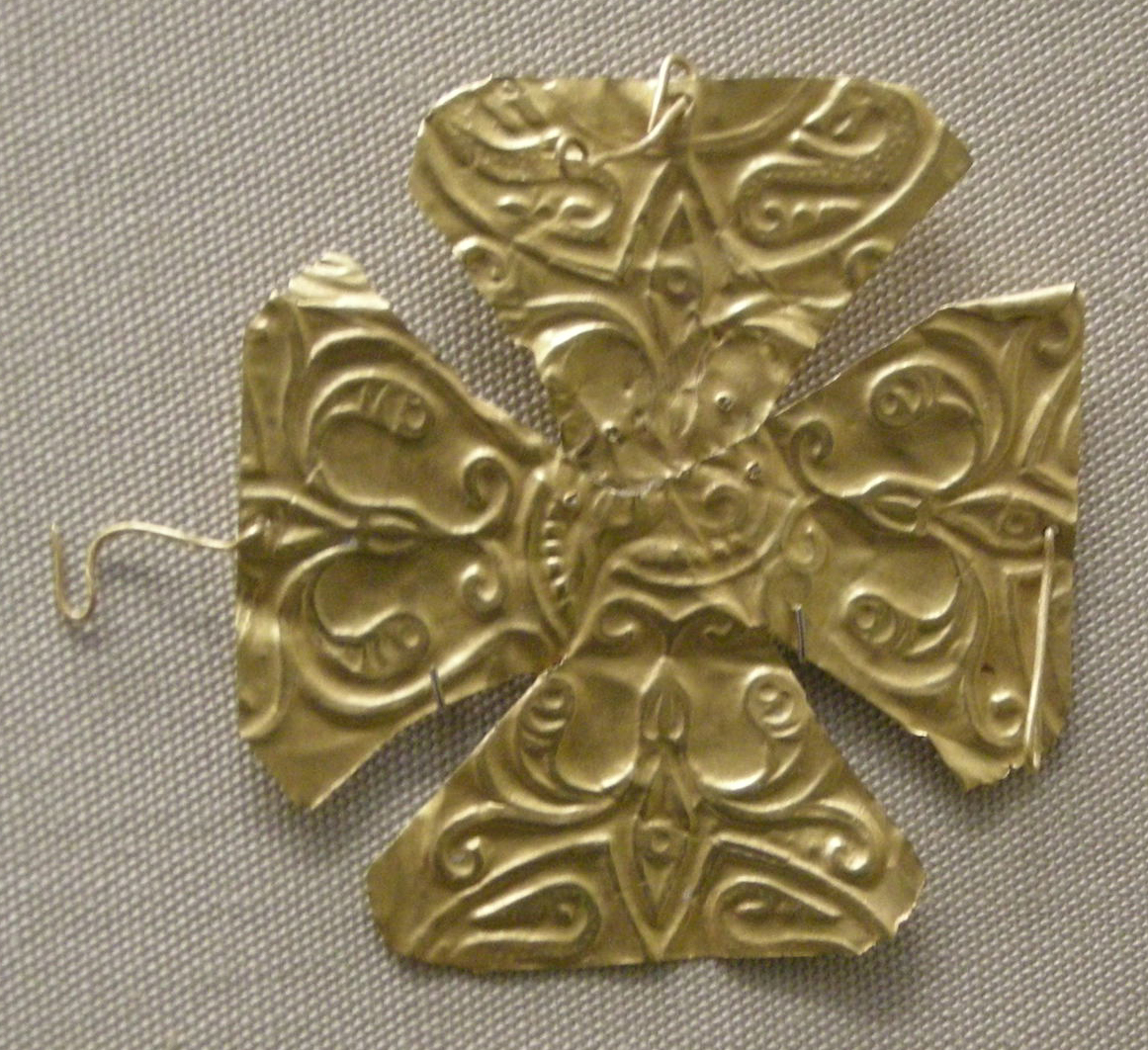
Another cross from the hoard with perforated loop

== See also ==
- Artres Treasure
- Domagnano Treasure
- Sutri Treasure
- Bergamo Treasure
