= Bergamo Treasure =

Treasure hoard found in Bergamo, Italy

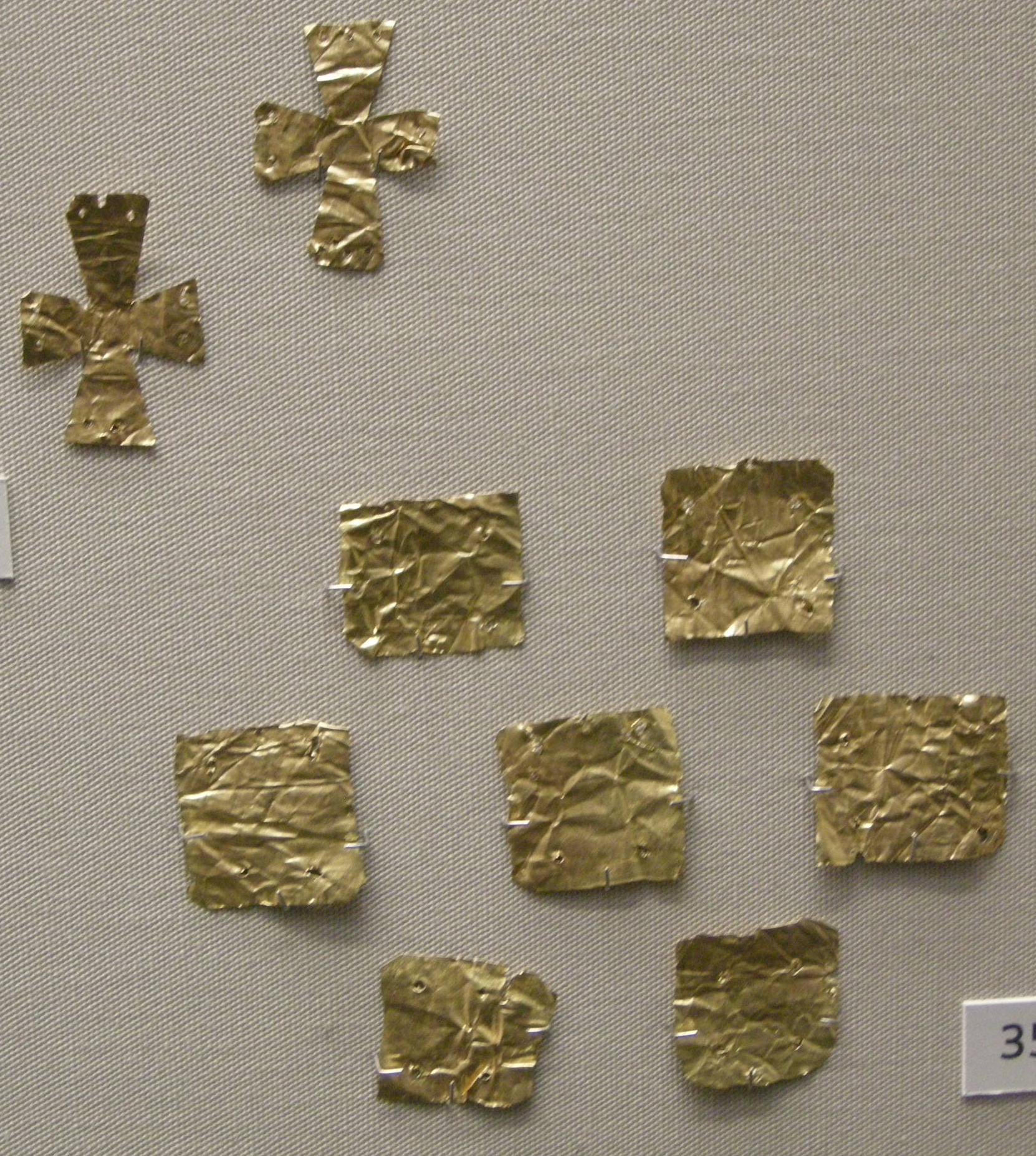
- Part of the Bergamo Treasure displayed in the British Museum
- Material: Gold and precious stones
- Size: 4.5 cm diameter (brooch)
- Created: 6th-7th Centuries AD
- Period/culture: Lombardic
- Present location: British Museum

The Bergamo Treasure is a large Lombardic and Ostrogothic hoard found near the city of Bergamo in northern Italy in the nineteenth century. It was mostly acquired by the British Museum in 1897.

== Discovery ==
The hoard was supposedly unearthed in three different graves near Bergamo in the province of Lombardy, Italy. From the 6th century AD, Bergamo was the seat of one of the most important Lombard duchies of northern Italy. Dating from this era, the prestigious items from the grave groups suggest they belonged to important figures at the Lombardic court. After its discovery, most of the treasure was purchased by the British Museum in 1897.

== Description ==
The Bergamo Treasure is largely composed of ecclesiastical and secular jewellery that reflect the contemporary tastes of Lombardic and Ostrogothic cultures. It includes two gold appliqué crosses and seven rectangular gold mounts that were probably attached to an item of clothing, various glass beads and bronze buckles, an agate pendant and several finger-rings and ear-rings. One of the finger rings is incised with the bust of a noble lady wearing a diadem and a pair of pendant earrings, inscribed either side with the lettering 'GUMED/RUTAVE'.

== Gallery ==
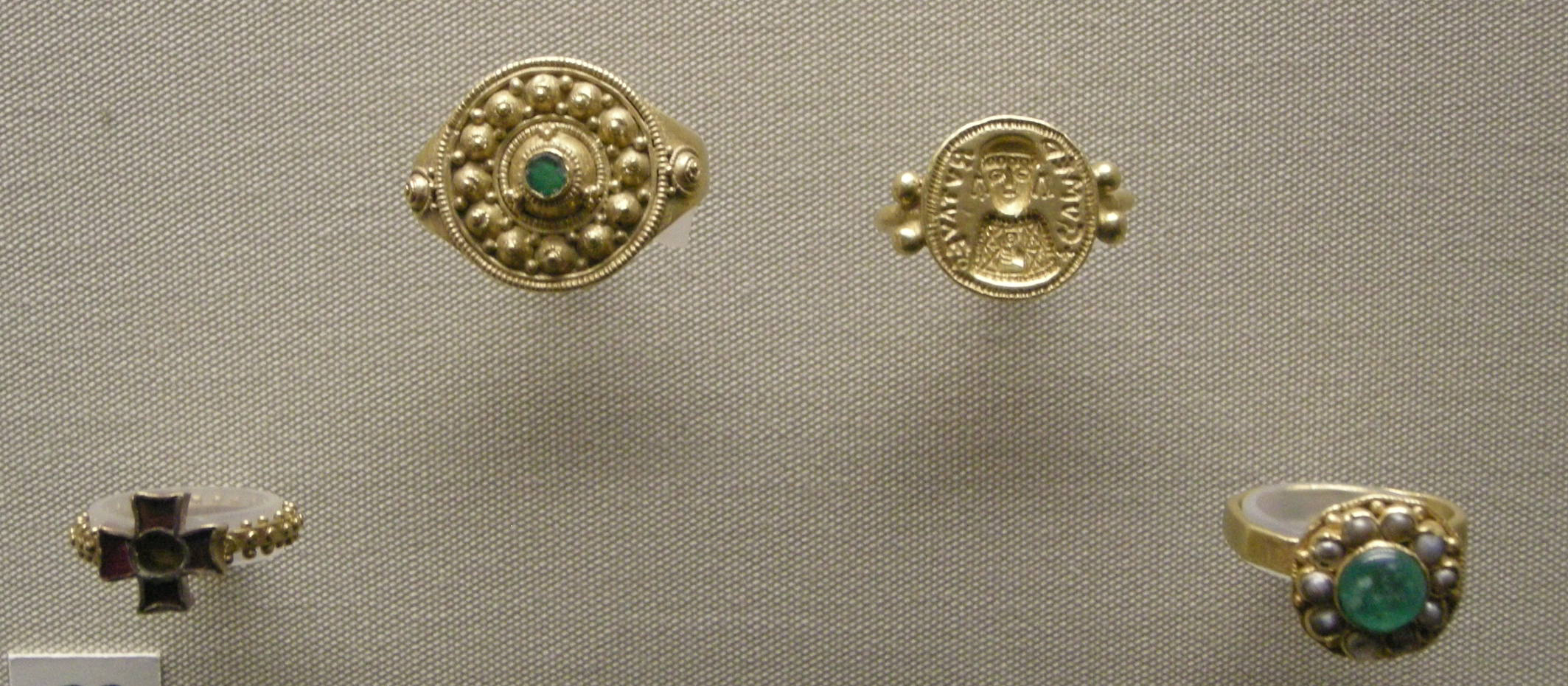
Image of the gold finger ring with the bust of the lady.

== See also ==
- Artres Treasure
- Domagnano Treasure
- Sutri Treasure
- Belluno Treasure
