= Artres Treasure =

Merovingian treasure hoard

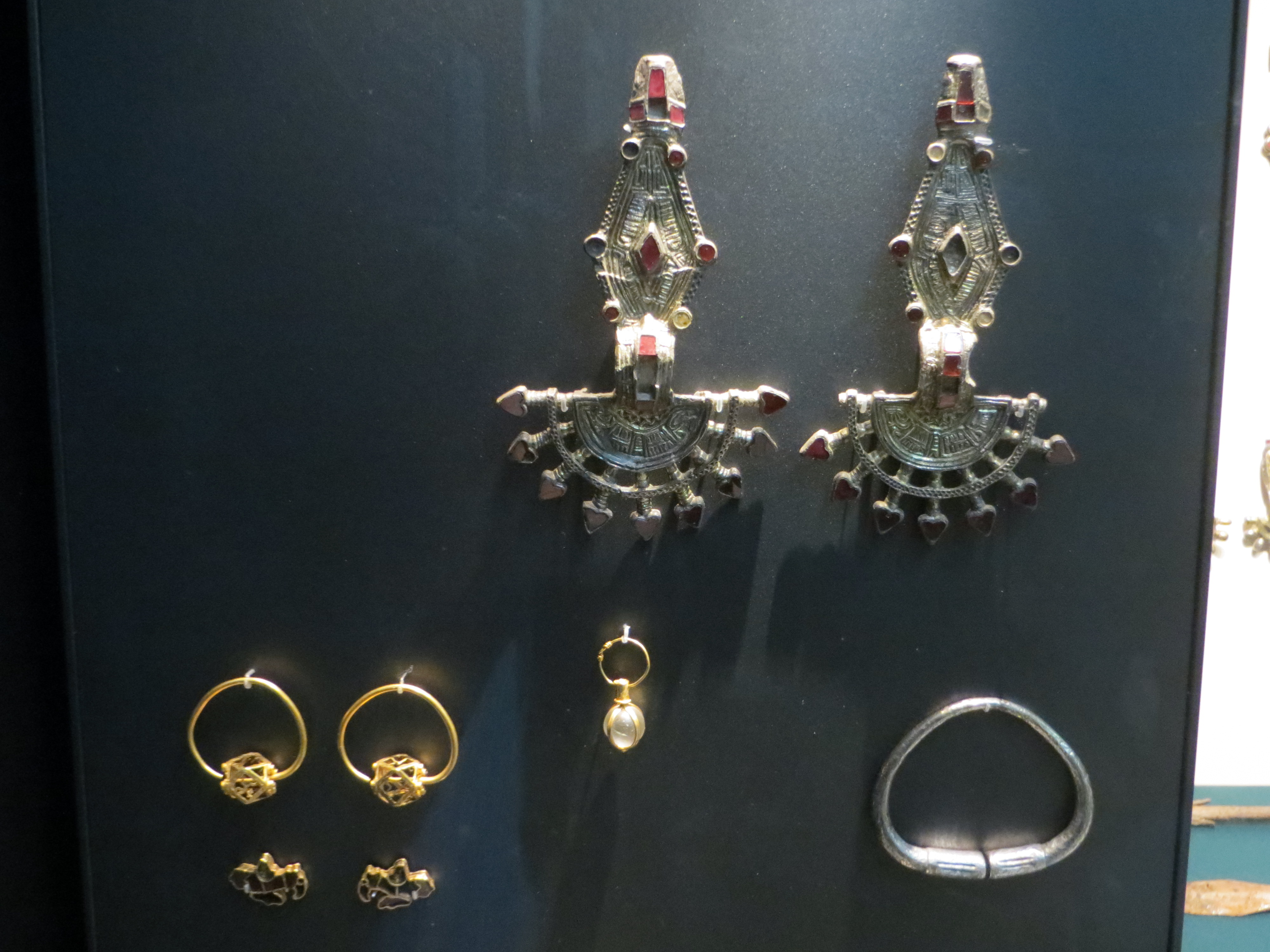
- Part of the Artres Treasure displayed in the British Museum
- Material: Gold and precious stones
- Created: 6th Centuries AD
- Period/culture: Merovingian
- Present location: British Museum
- Identification: 1897 AF.514a-b; AF.515; AF.518; AF.524-525; AF.3328;

The Artres Treasure is an important Merovingian hoard found at Artres, northern France in the nineteenth century. Most of the treasure is now in the collection of the British Museum in London.

== Discovery ==
The rich grave group was found in 1855 under a small mound near the town of Artres in Pas-de-Calais, northern France. Dating to the middle of the 6th Century AD, it probably belong to an affluent and powerful Frankish woman. Most of the hoard was purchased by the curator and philanthropist Augustus Wollaston Franks, who bequeathed it to the British Museum in 1897. It has recently been shown that a gold disk pendant (now in the Ashmolean Museum) was also part of the hoard.

== Description ==
The Artres Treasure for the most part includes luxurious jewellery fashionable at the Frankish court. It is composed of two large gilded silver fan-shaped brooches, a pair of small gold and garnet encrusted brooches in the shape of a bird, a pair of matching earrings, a crystal ball pendant and a small silver bracelet. Other items in the hoard included a finger ring and a large crystal ball; the whereabouts of these objects are unknown.

== See also ==
- Sutton Hoo
- Domagnano Treasure
- Sutri Treasure
- Bergamo Treasure
