= Domagnano Treasure =

Ostrogothic treasure trove

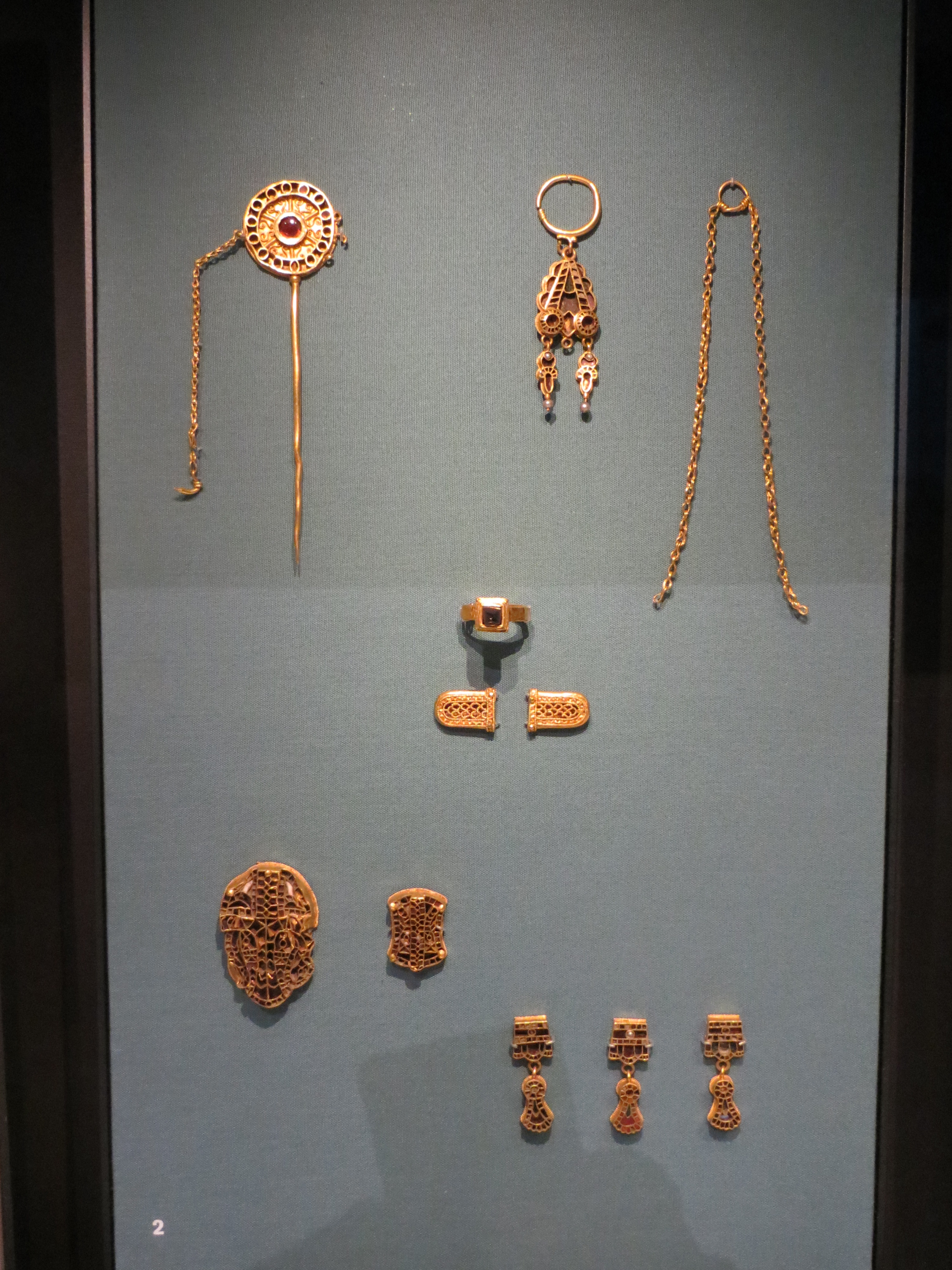
- Part of the Domagnano Treasure displayed in the British Museum
- Material: Gold and precious stones
- Created: Late 5th - early 6th Centuries AD
- Period/culture: Ostrogothic
- Present location: British Museum
- Identification: 1933,0405.1–11

The Domagnano Treasure is an important Ostrogothic hoard found at Domagnano, Republic of San Marino in the late nineteenth century. The treasure is now divided among various institutions, including the Louvre Abu Dhabi, although the bulk of the hoard is currently held by the British Museum in London and the Germanisches Nationalmuseum in Nuremberg.

== Discovery ==
The treasure was apparently discovered in 1892–1893 at the Lagucci farm near Domagnano in the Republic of San Marino. The exact circumstances of its discovery remain unclear, but it is thought that the hoard was part of one or more graves. The Domagnano Treasure is largely composed of a set of jewellery from the 5th or 6th centuries that may have belonged to an Ostrogothic princess or noble lady of high rank.

== Description ==
The Domagnano Treasure seems to have been made for a royal client as the purity of the precious metals used in its manufacture and the quality of the craftsmanship are very high. The design of some of the jewellery incorporates Christian motifs and also reflects contemporary fashions from the Byzantine Empire and the Gothic period. The treasure is now divided among various museums, as follows:

- Germanisches Nationalmuseum in Nuremberg: A fibula in the shape of an eagle, an earring, five pendants from a necklace and a cicada fibula (in the shape of an insect).
- British Museum : An earring, three pendants from a necklace, a large and small mount, a pair of knife sheaths, a finger ring, a gold hair pin with flat disk head and a chain necklace.
- Museo di Stato di San Marino: A small mount.
- Metropolitan Museum of Art in New York: A pendant from a necklace.
- Louvre Abu Dhabi: A fibula in the shape of an eagle

== Gallery ==
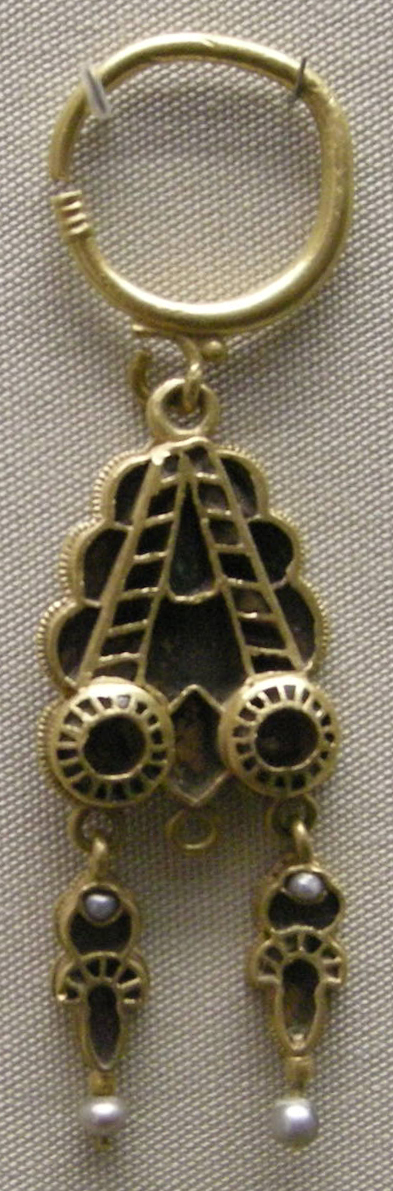
Gold earring with sub-pendants in the shape of an insect (BM)

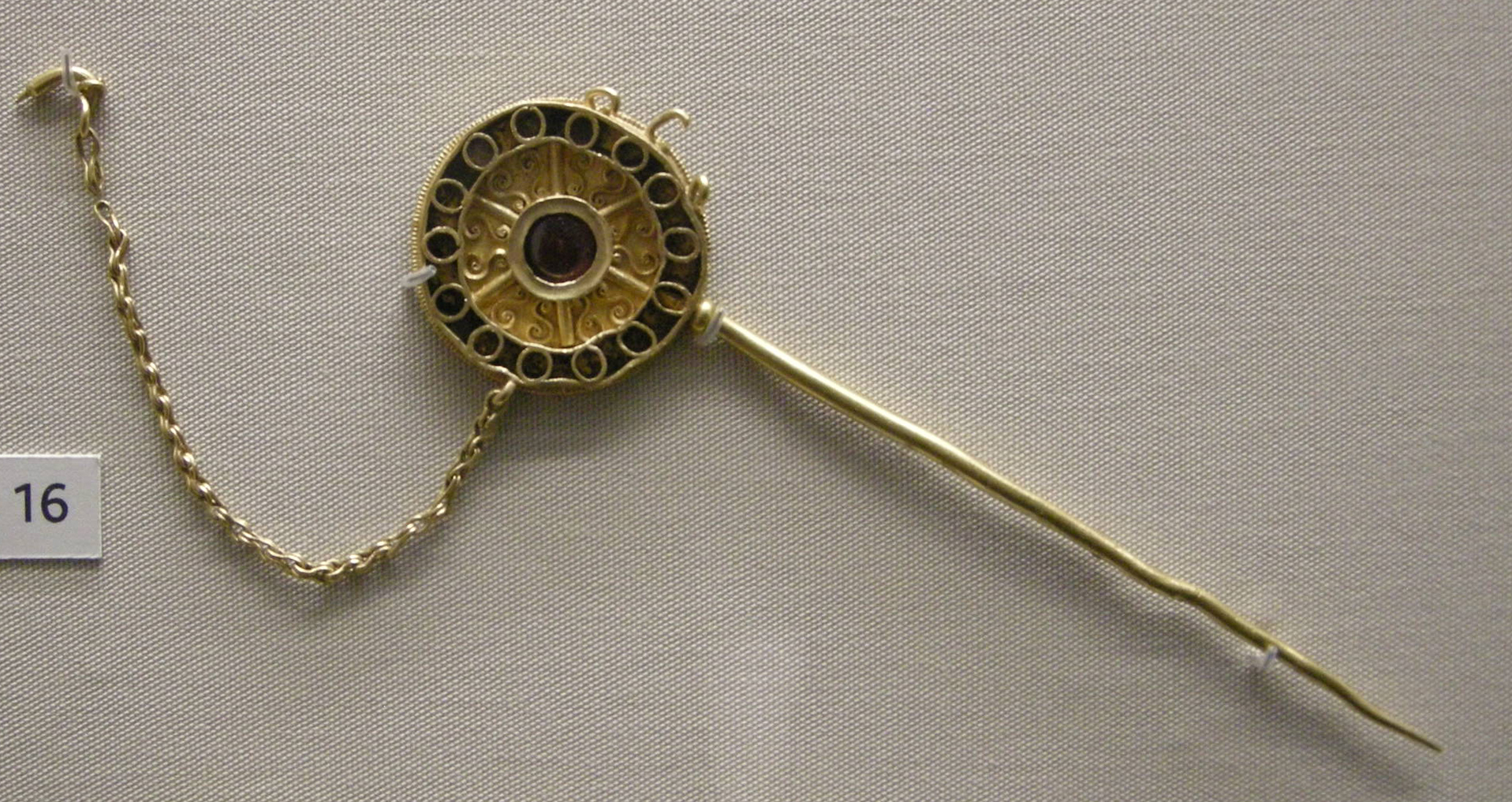
Gold pin with circular disk from a head dress (BM)

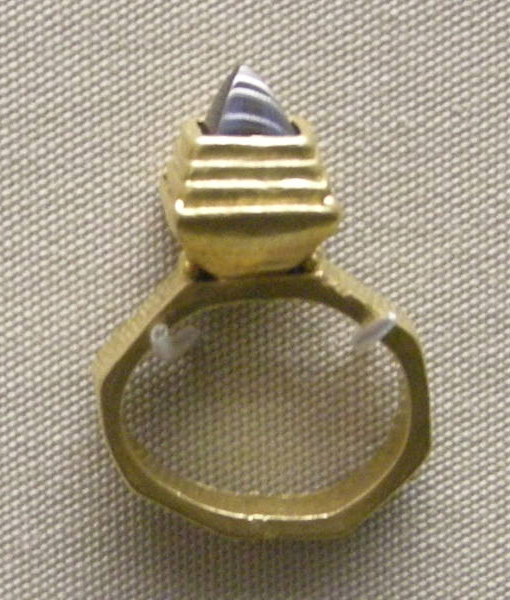
Gold finger ring with garnet inlay (BM)

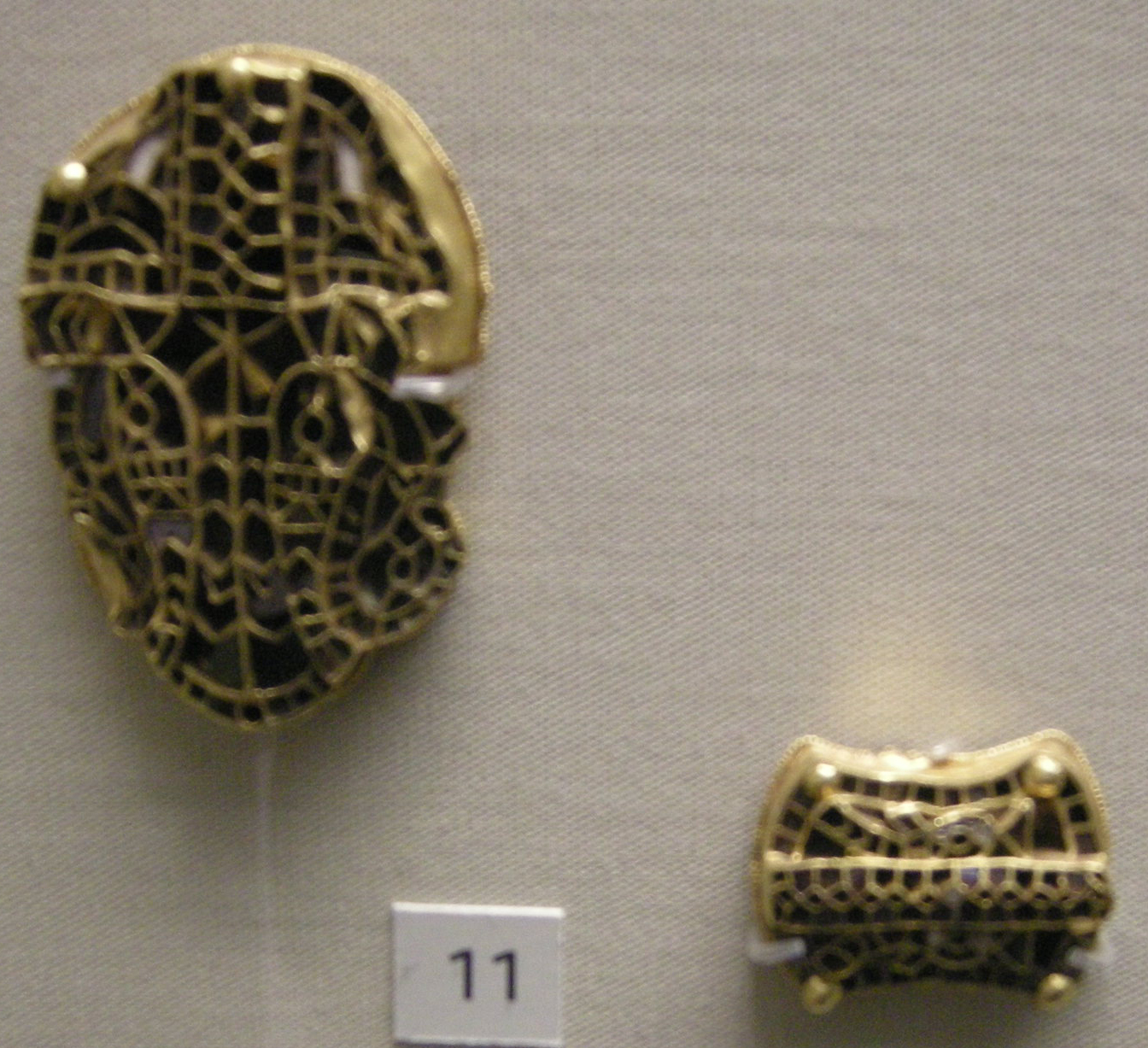
Two mounts, possibly for a purse (BM)

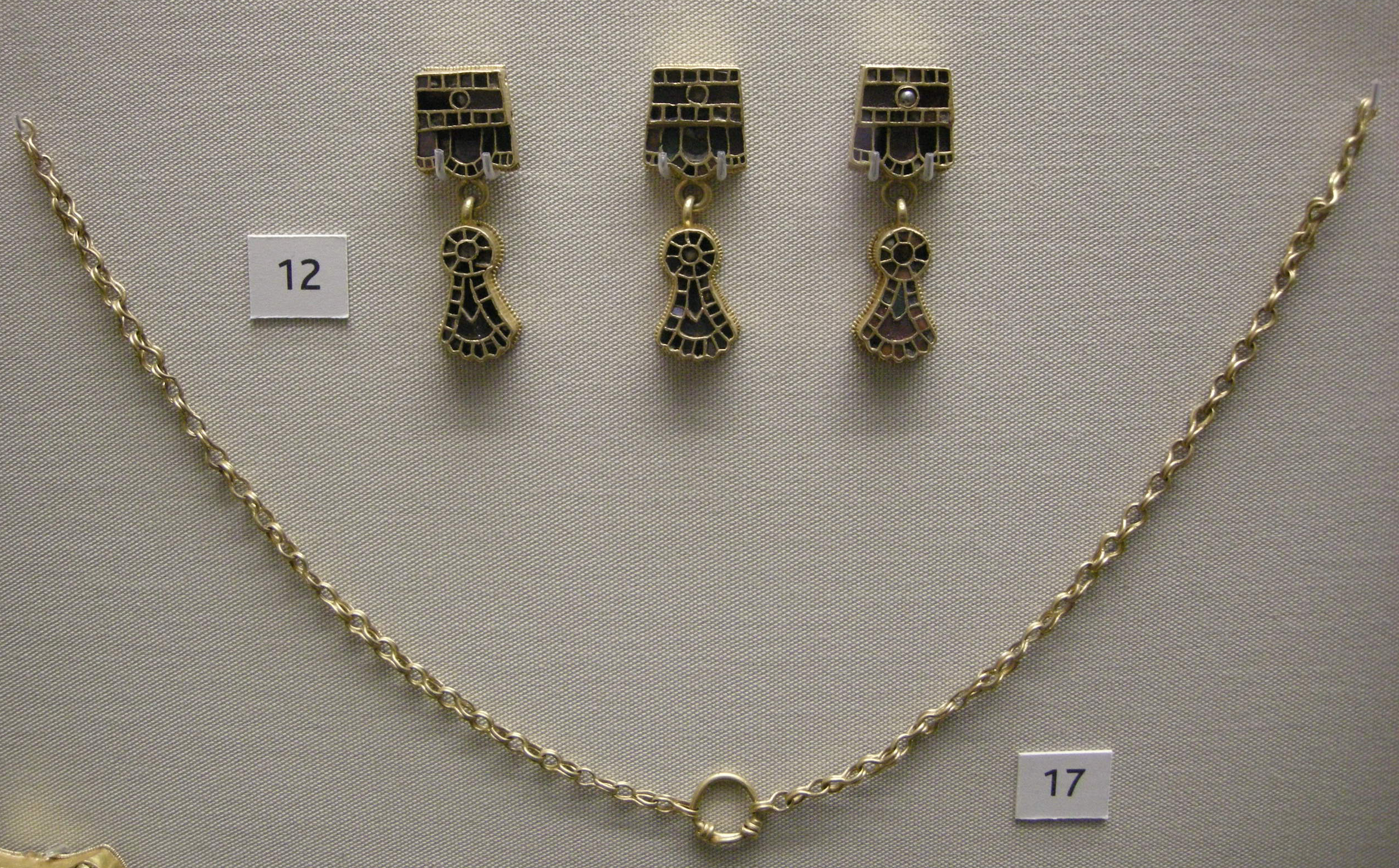
Chain and three necklace pendants from the treasure (BM)

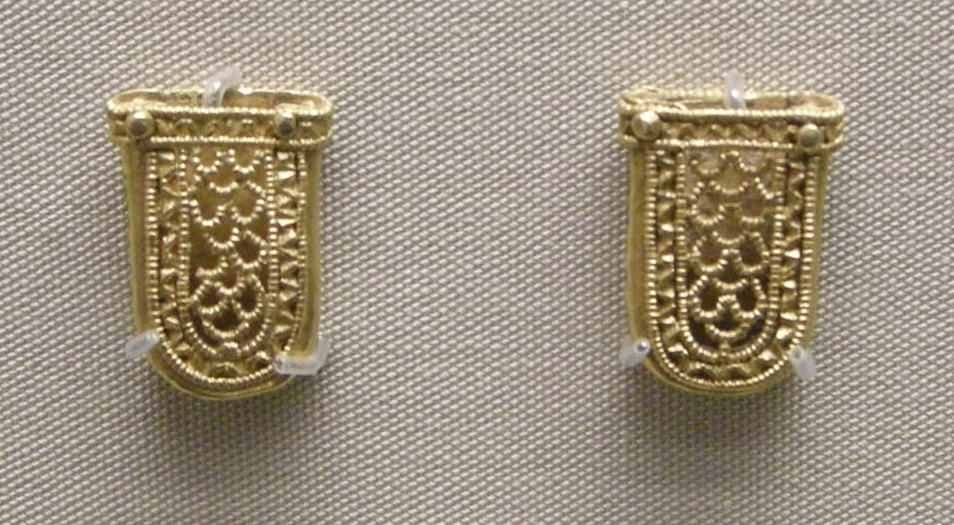
Pair of identical of gold knife chapes (BM)

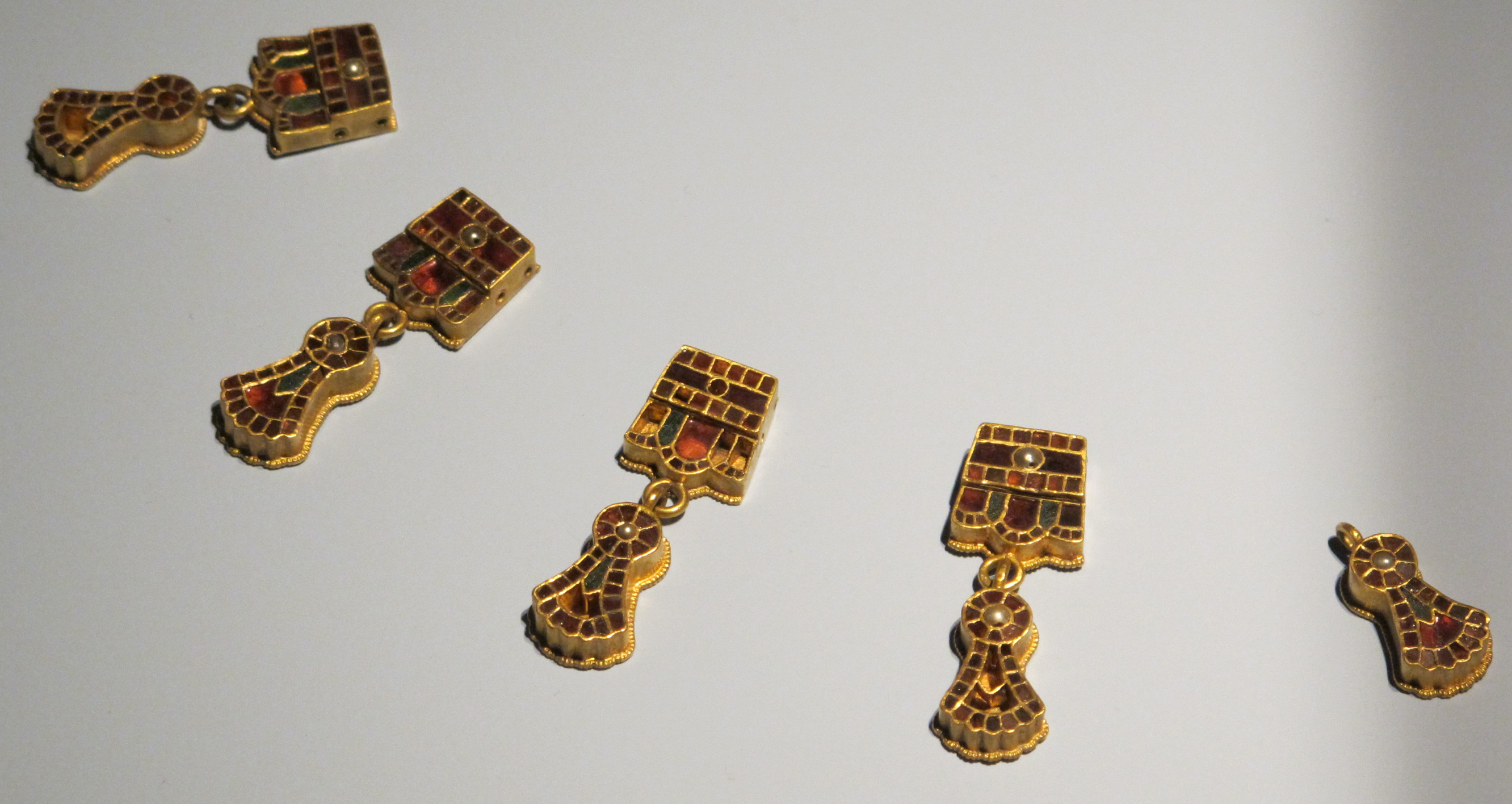
Five of the necklace pendants (one slightly damaged) (GNM)

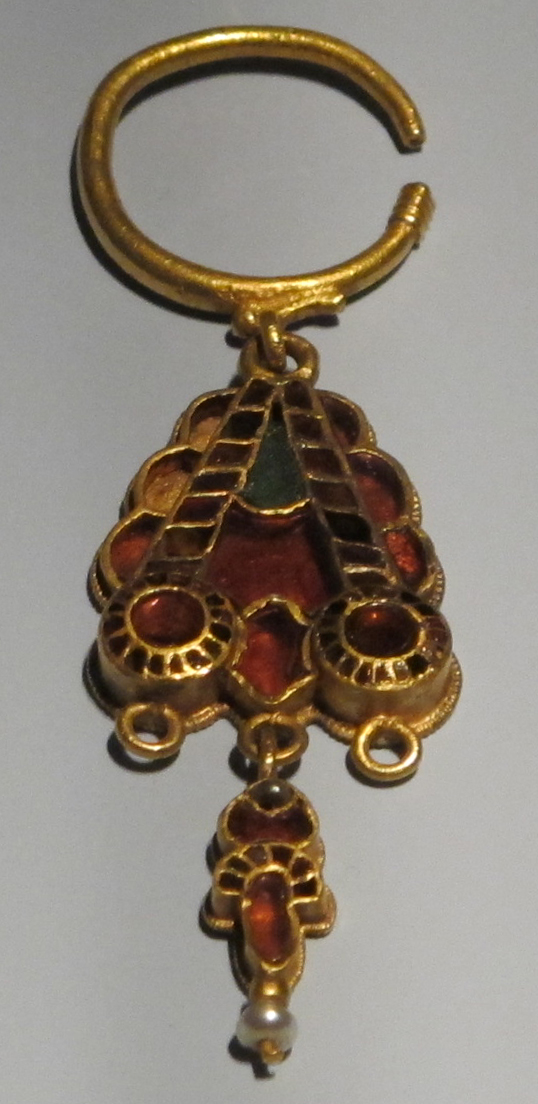
Similar earring to the BM example but with a single sub-pendant (GNM)

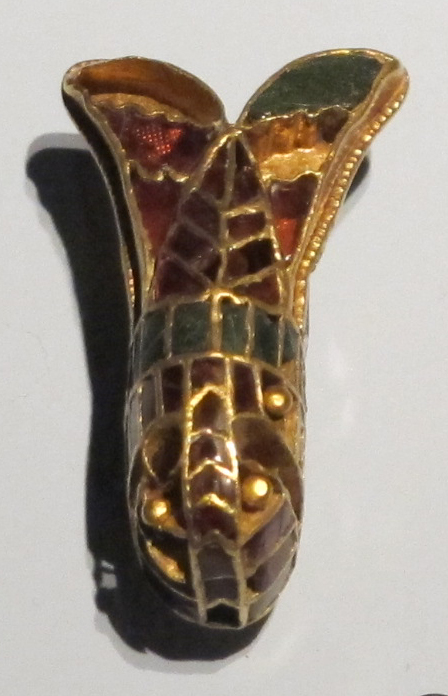
A fibula in the shape of an insect (GNM)

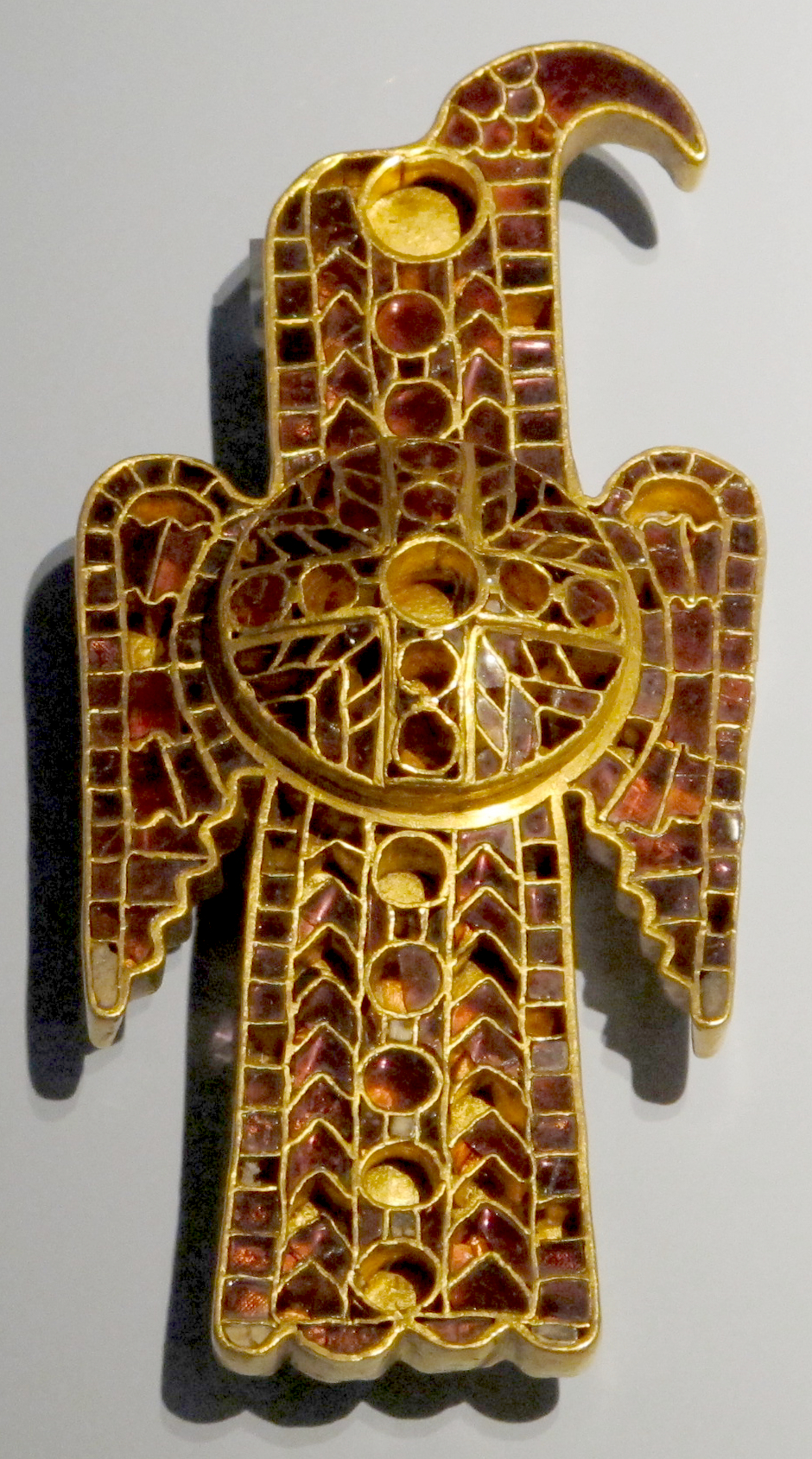
One of a pair of brooches in the shape of an eagle that are both 12 cm long (GNM)

== See also ==
- Sutton Hoo
- Sutri Treasure
- Artres Treasure
- Bergamo Treasure
