= Sutri Treasure =

Lombardic hoard

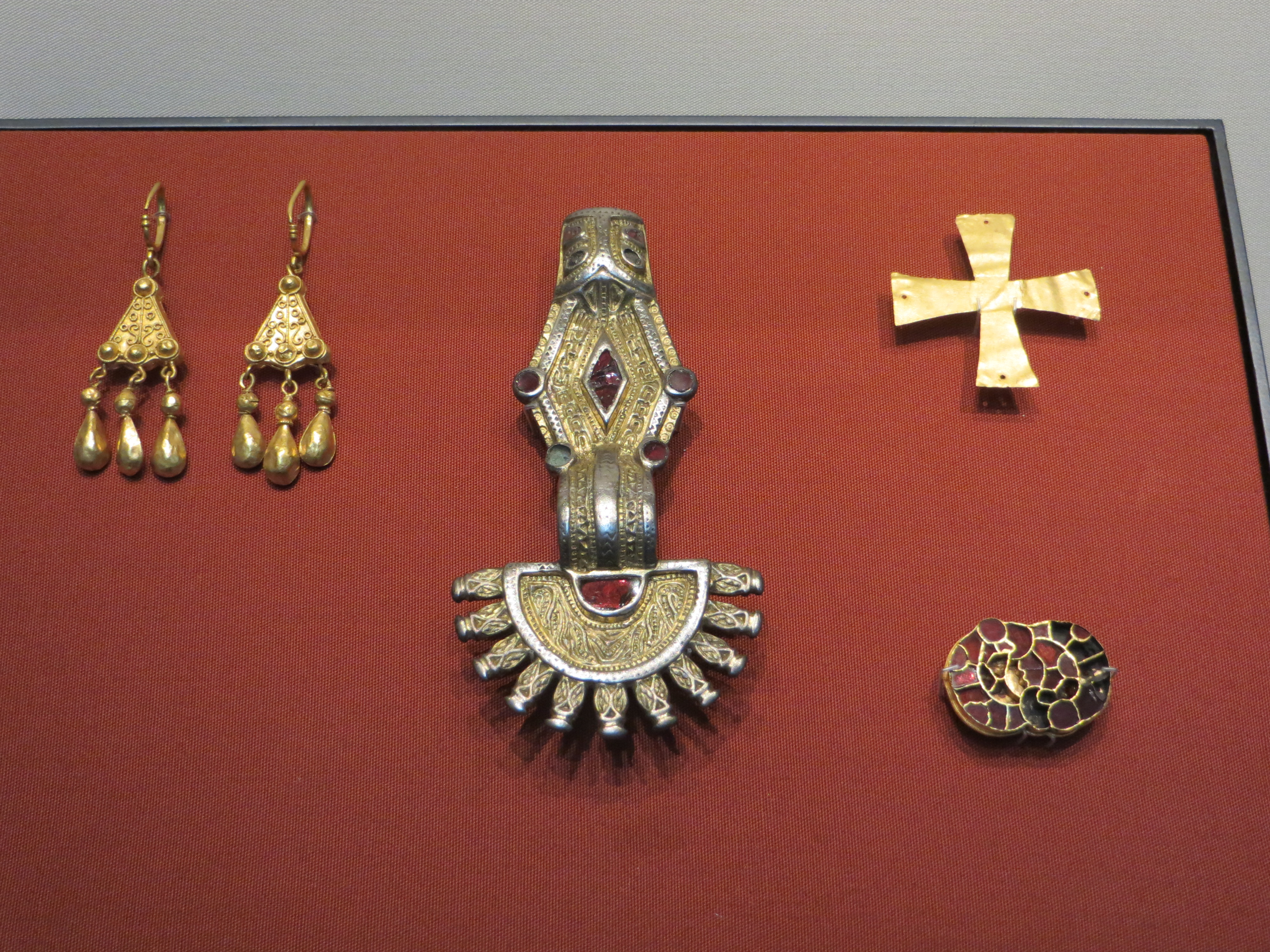
- Part of the Sutri Treasure displayed in the British Museum
- Material: Gold and precious stones
- Created: 6th-7th Centuries AD
- Period/culture: Lombardic
- Present location: British Museum
- Identification: 1887,0108,3-9

The Sutri Treasure is an important Lombardic hoard found at Sutri, Italy in the late nineteenth century that is currently in the collections of the British Museum in London.

== Discovery ==
The rich grave group was found in 1878 near the town of Sutri in the province of Viterbo in central Italy. Dating to the 6th-7th centuries AD, the treasure was buried at a time of conflict between the Kingdom of the Lombards and the Eastern Roman Empire. Nine years after its discovery, the hoard was purchased by the British Museum, where it resides to this day.

== Description ==
Given the large number of prestigious items in the treasure, it probably belonged to a noble lady of high rank from the Lombardic court. It includes a blue glass drinking horn, two greenish-blue small amphoras, a gilded fan-shaped silver brooch, a gold and garnet encrusted S-shaped brooch, a simple gold cross and a pair of earrings with triple pendants. A number of other items (including a pin, beads, coins, another drinking horn and a third brooch) were not purchased by the museum at the time; their current whereabouts is unknown.

== Gallery ==
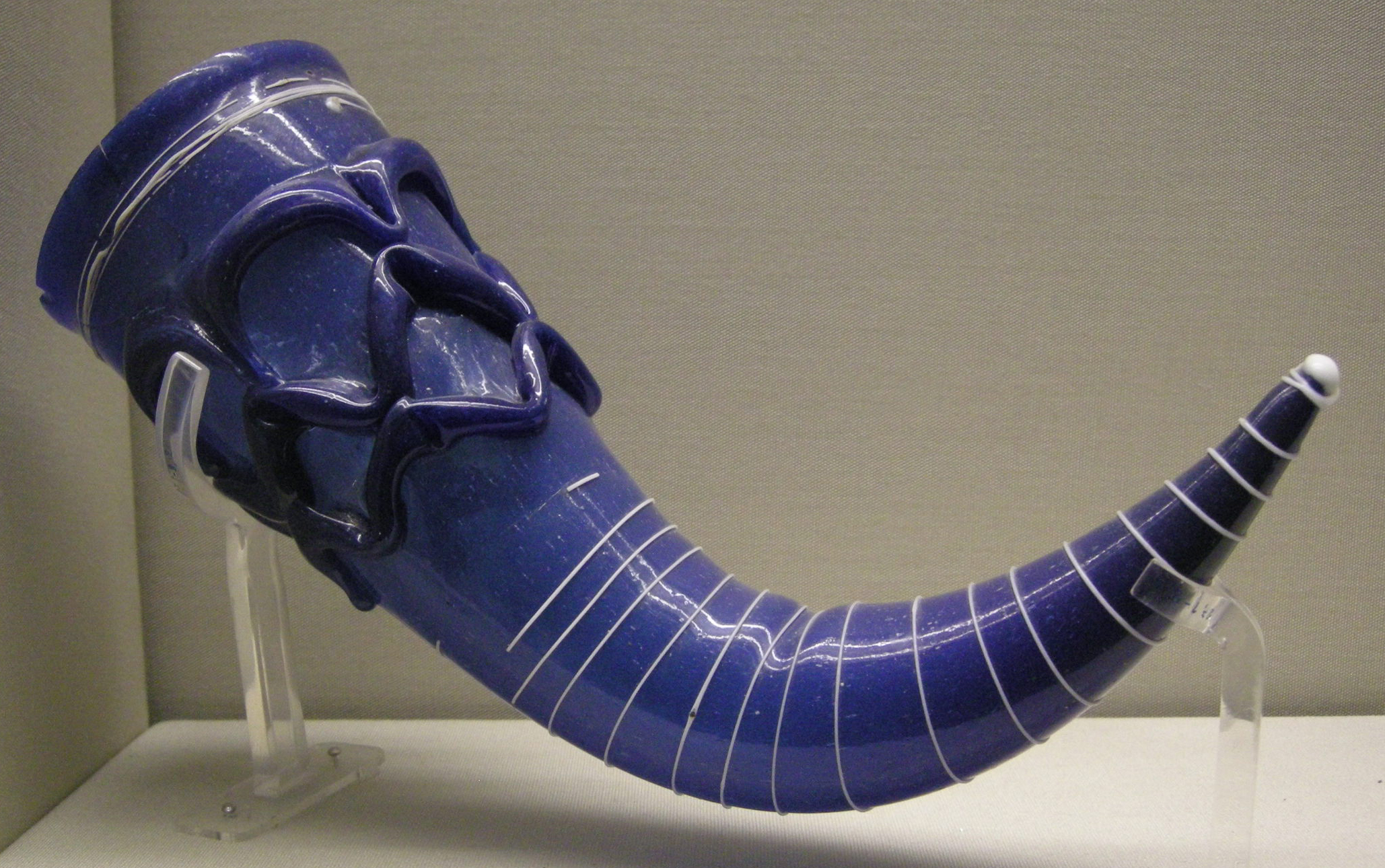
One of the two drinking horns from the treasure

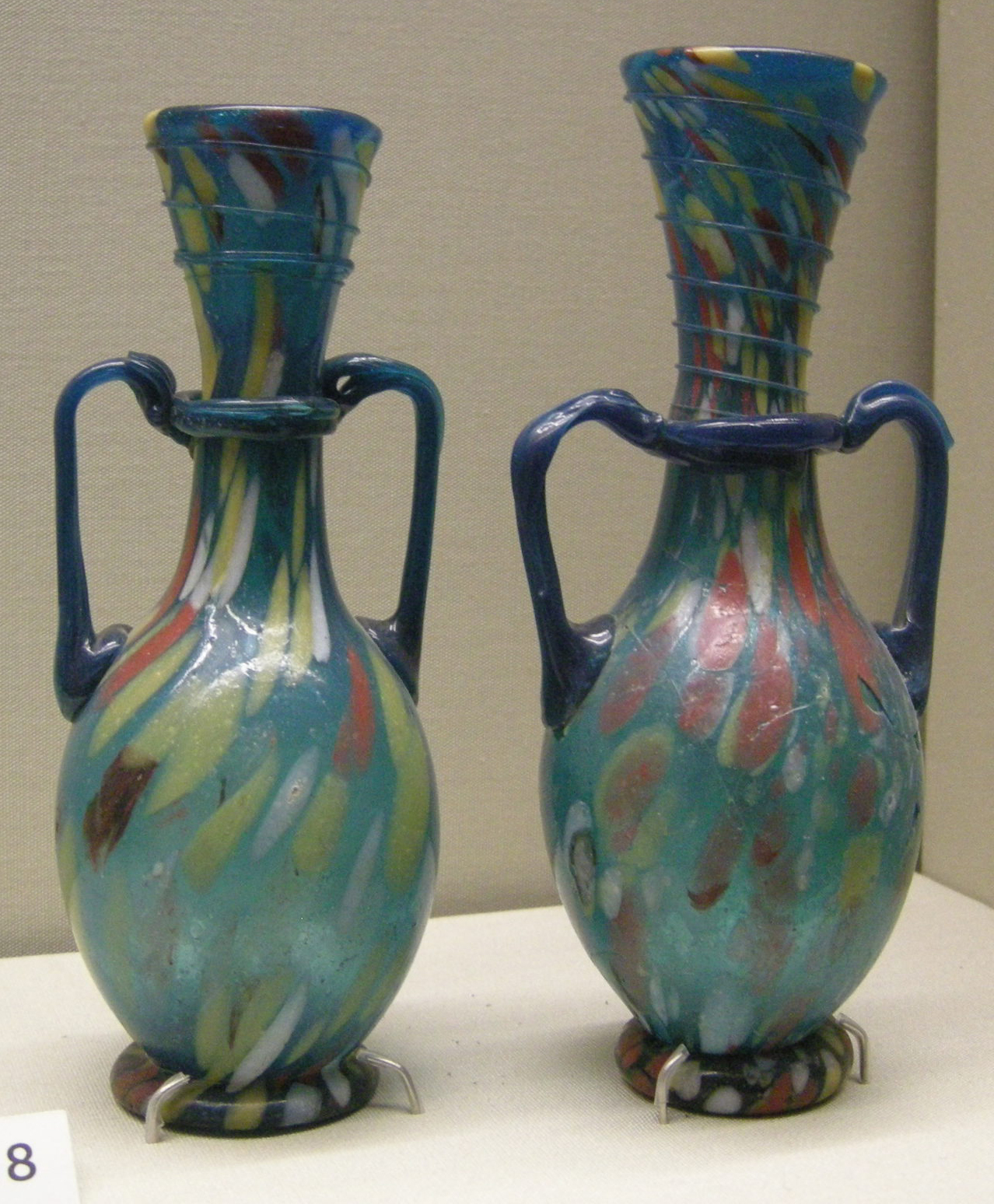
Two small glass amphora that date from Roman times

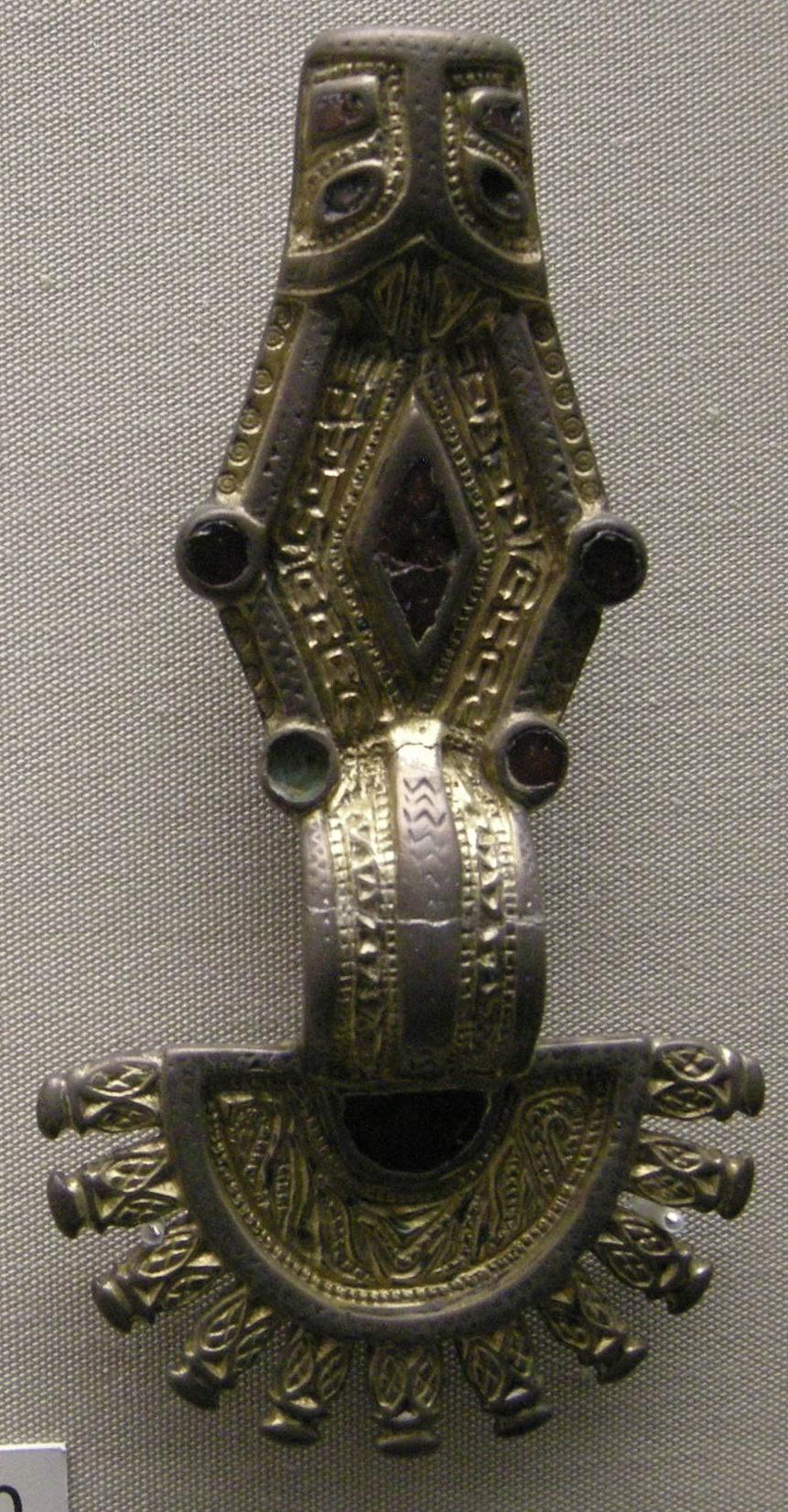
The large Lombardic brooch with the terminal in the shape of an animal's head

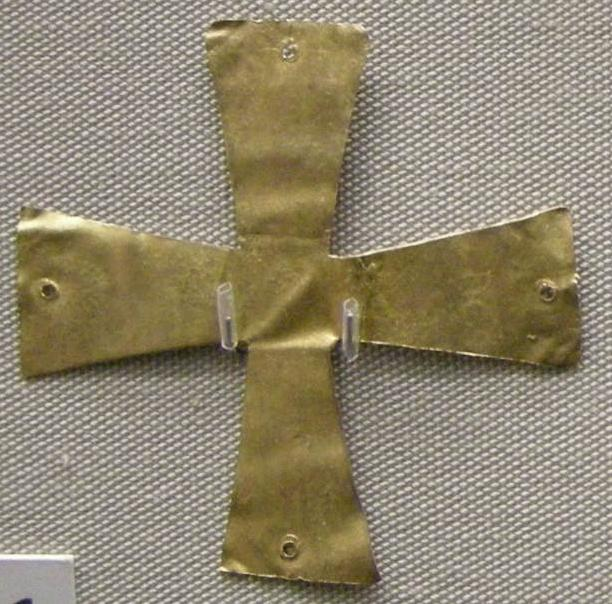
Plain gold cross, which indicates that the person buried was Christian

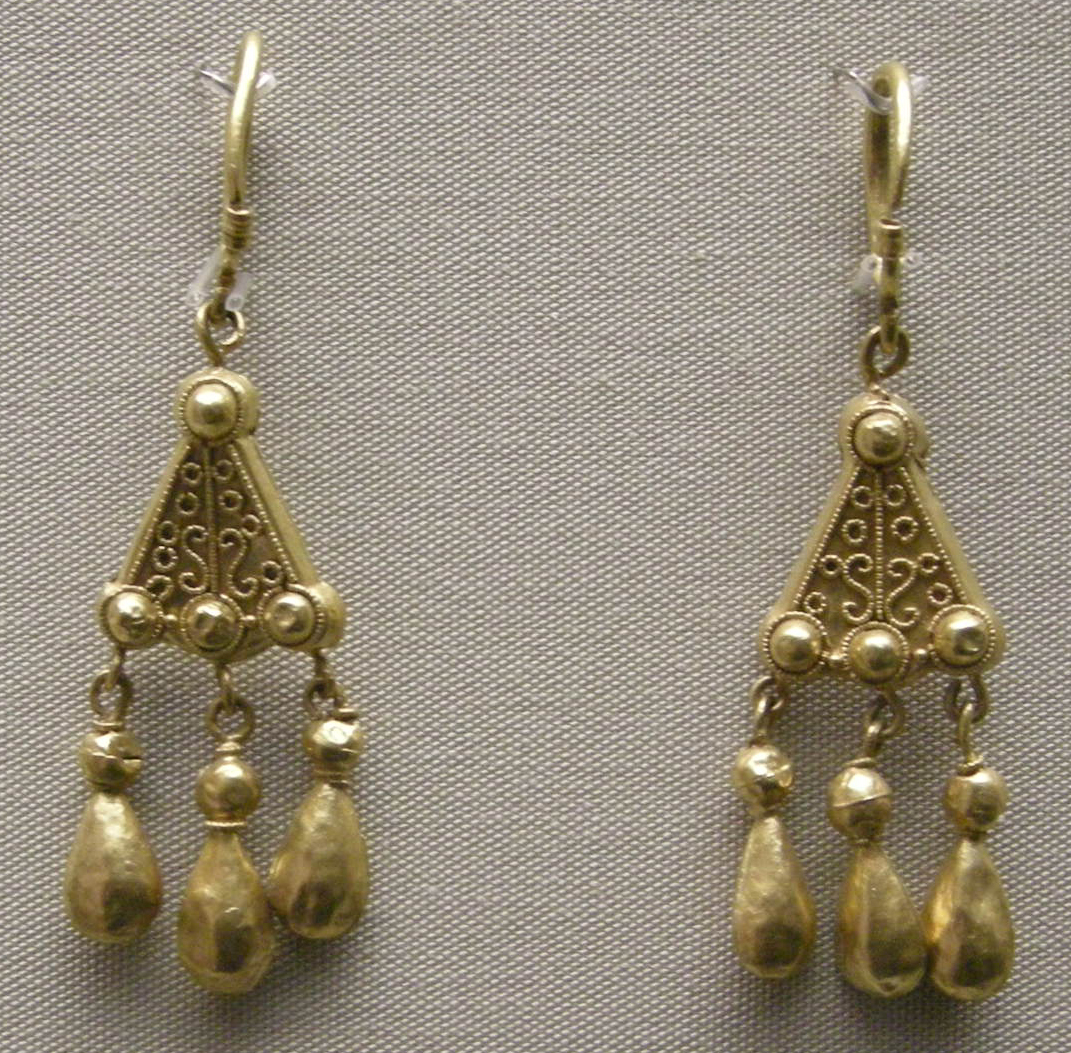
Pair of matching earrings with triple pendants

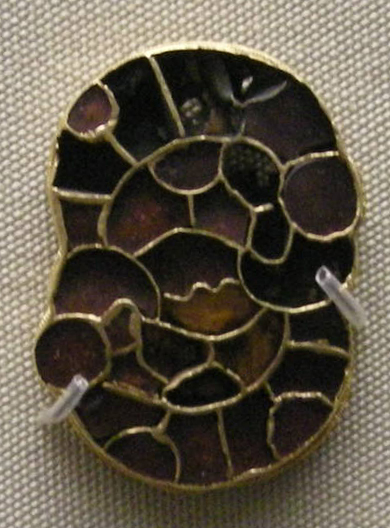
S-shaped cloisonné brooch with representations of eagles

== See also ==
- Sutton Hoo
- Artres Treasure
- Domagnano Treasure
