= Mihailovac =

Archaeological site in Serbia

Mihailovac is an archeological site and settlement near Vršac, Serbia.

The findings have characteristics of the La Tène and span from the 2nd century BC until the 1st century AD, mostly pottery, accessories (jewelry, fibulae) and weapons.
