= Druid =

Priestly and learned class of the ancient Celts

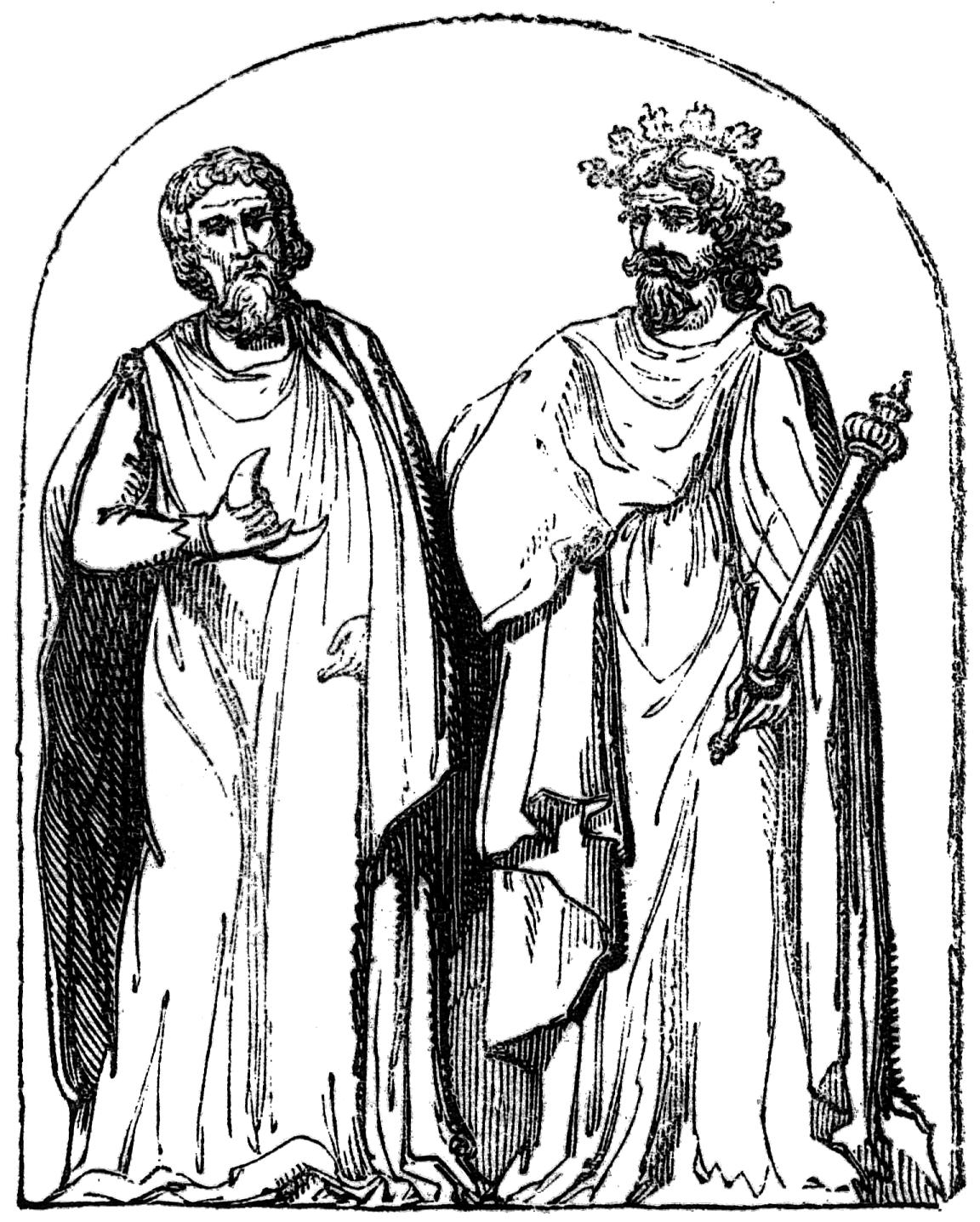
Two Druids, a 19th-century engraving after a 1719 illustration by Bernard de Montfaucon, who claimed to reproduce a bas-relief from Autun. It reflects the antiquarian imagination rather than any ancient depiction.

A druid (Gaulish: druides, from Proto-Celtic *druwides, 'oak-knower' or '[priest with] strong insight') was a member of the learned class of the ancient Celtic peoples of Gaul and the British Isles, described by Greek and Roman writers as a priest, teacher, judge and custodian of religious and legal tradition. Because the druids committed nothing of their teaching to writing and cannot be securely identified in the archaeological record, almost everything known about them comes from outside observers.

Classical authors placed the druids only in Gaul and Britain, never among the other Celtic-speaking peoples. The earliest notices, of the 4th and 3rd centuries BCE, treat them as 'barbarian' philosophers akin to the Persian magi and the Indian gymnosophists. Much of the surviving material descends from the lost ethnography of Posidonius, and the fullest account is that of Julius Caesar, whose reliability has long been debated. The druids were credited with teaching the immortality of the soul and with officiating at sacrifices. The familiar modern image of white robes, oak groves, mistletoe and a golden sickle derives largely from a single passage of Pliny the Elder.

The druids declined after the Roman conquest of Gaul and were the object of imperial prohibitions in the 1st century CE, after which they faded from the Continental record. In Ireland, which Rome never reached, and more rarely in Wales, medieval literature preserves many druids, but these accounts are now generally read as literary constructs of their Christian authors rather than as reliable evidence for pre-Christian religion.

From the 16th century onward the druids became a screen for successive reinterpretations: noble monotheist philosophers of Renaissance humanism, the supposed builders of Stonehenge, bards of the Romantic imagination, and, in the present day, figures of a modern Druidry and Celtic neo-paganism that has no genuine continuity with the ancient priesthood. Modern scholarship accepts the druids as a real priestly and learned order of the Iron Age Celts, while stressing how little about them can be established with confidence.

== Etymology ==
The modern English druid comes from French druide, itself from Latin *druida (found only in plural, druides), certainly borrowed from Gaulish druides. (Note: The Old English word drȳ for a magician or wizard is a borrowing from Celtic, either from Irish or from Brythonic.) The Gaulish word is cognate with Old Irish druí (pl. druíd, 'magician, wizard') and Middle Welsh dryw ('seer'). In both Irish and Welsh, druí and dryw could, in certain contexts, also denote the wren, a bird regarded as prophetic in these traditions. Middle Welsh derwydd ('seer') and Old Breton dorguid ('prophetic, magical') represent parallel formations. (Note: The Brythonic forms derwydd and dorguid could reflect an analogical reformation of inherited Proto-Celtic *dru-wid- to *daru-wid- (based on Celtic *daru- 'oak tree'), or alternatively derive from another form *do-are-wid- ('who sees beyond').)

All these forms stem from a Proto-Celtic noun reconstructed as *druwids (pl. *druwides). The second element is generally derived from the Proto-Indo-European (PIE) verb *weyd- ('see, know'). The origin of the first element was debated in the first part of the 20th century, but now most scholars trace it to PIE *derw- ≈ *dru- ('oak'), which metaphorically also meant 'strong, firm'.

On this basis, the Celtic compound *druwids has been variously interpreted as 'oak-knower, well versed in oaks', 'knower of trees', possibly 'knower of the world-tree', (Note: Linguist Xavier Delamarre has proposed to interpret the name as the 'knower of the world-tree', situating it within an Indo-European tradition of cosmic trees (Old Norse Yggdrasil, Vedic skambhá). According to him, this reading aligns with the Celtic tripartite cosmology (Proto-Celtic *albiyos 'upper world', *bitus 'middle world' and *dubnos 'lower world'), and with Caesar's description of the druids as transmitters of knowledge about the cosmos, nature, and the gods.) or as the priest with 'strong insight'. Pliny the Elder had already offered a folk etymology deriving druid from Greek drŷs ('oak') in the 1st century CE. An older interpretation, advanced by Rudolf Thurneysen in 1893, interpreted the first element as an intensive prefix, yielding the meaning 'the very wise'. Although Thurneysen himself retracted it in 1927, this older reading continues to appear occasionally in popular literature. (Note: The earlier interpretation rested on the Galatian assembly place drynemeton, recorded by Strabo, whose second element is the well-attested Celtic word nemeton 'sanctuary'. In 1893 the Celticist Rudolf Thurneysen read the first element dru- as an intensifying prefix, understanding drynemeton as 'arch-sanctuary' and, by extension, druid as 'the very wise'. Thurneysen retracted this in 1927, concluding that no such intensive prefix could be demonstrated, so that 'oak-knower' for druid and 'oak-sanctuary' for drynemeton were preferable. The later interpretation has since become standard, although the older reading, 'the very wise', continues to appear sometimes in popular literature.)

== Sources ==
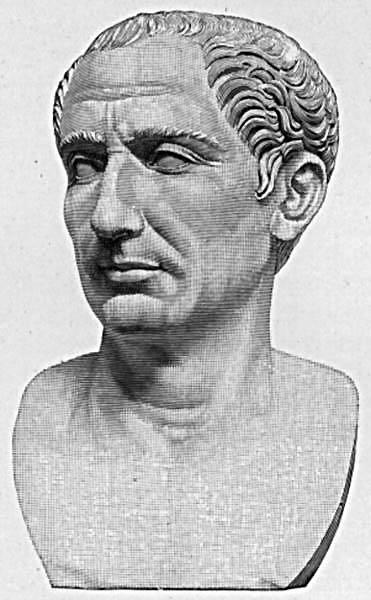
Julius Caesar, whose Commentarii de Bello Gallico is the earliest detailed account of the druids.

The druids left no records of their own, so knowledge of them rests on Greek and Roman testimony, supplemented with caution by later insular literature and by archaeology. Between the 4th century BCE and the 4th century CE some twenty classical authors referred to the druids of Gaul and Britain. The archaeologist Stuart Piggott distinguished two strands in the classical image of the druids: a 'Posidonian' tradition, often unfavourable and stressing sacrifice, and an 'Alexandrian' tradition of soft primitivism that presented them as noble sages of a golden age.

=== Posidonius ===
Much of the 1st-century material descends from the lost Celtic ethnography of the Stoic philosopher Posidonius of Apamea (c. 135–51 BCE), who visited Massalia around 100–90 BCE. Diodorus and Strabo drew on him directly, and Ammianus did so through Timagenes. Most modern commentators accept that Caesar too drew on Posidonius, although Caesar also possessed extensive first-hand knowledge of Gaul, and his account contains much found in no other source.

The relationship between these texts has been much debated. In 1960 J. J. Tierney attempted to reconstruct Posidonius's ethnography from later authors, arguing that Caesar had taken most of his account from Posidonius and had exaggerated the power of the druids for political reasons. Tierney further held that the druids' medico-magical role was the real basis of their standing and that their reputation for philosophy was a mere ideological superstructure. Daphne Nash provided a comprehensive refutation in 1976, arguing for the originality of Caesar's account. Following the work of Ian Kidd, classicists have adopted a minimalist approach to Posidonian attribution, cautioning against tracing every later notice to his lost history.

Building on this, Jane Webster argued in 1999 that, because Posidonius wrote about the Marseille littoral a generation after its annexation whereas Caesar wrote about a Gaul not yet conquered, the socio-political features found only in Caesar (a supra-tribal order, judicial arbitration, an annual assembly, a British origin, and exemption from tax and military service) are precisely those to be expected of pre-conquest druids. On this reading it is not Caesar but his later borrowers, Diodorus, Timagenes and Strabo, who are anachronistic, since they projected an out-dated ethnography onto the Gaul of their own day.

=== Other Graeco-Roman accounts ===
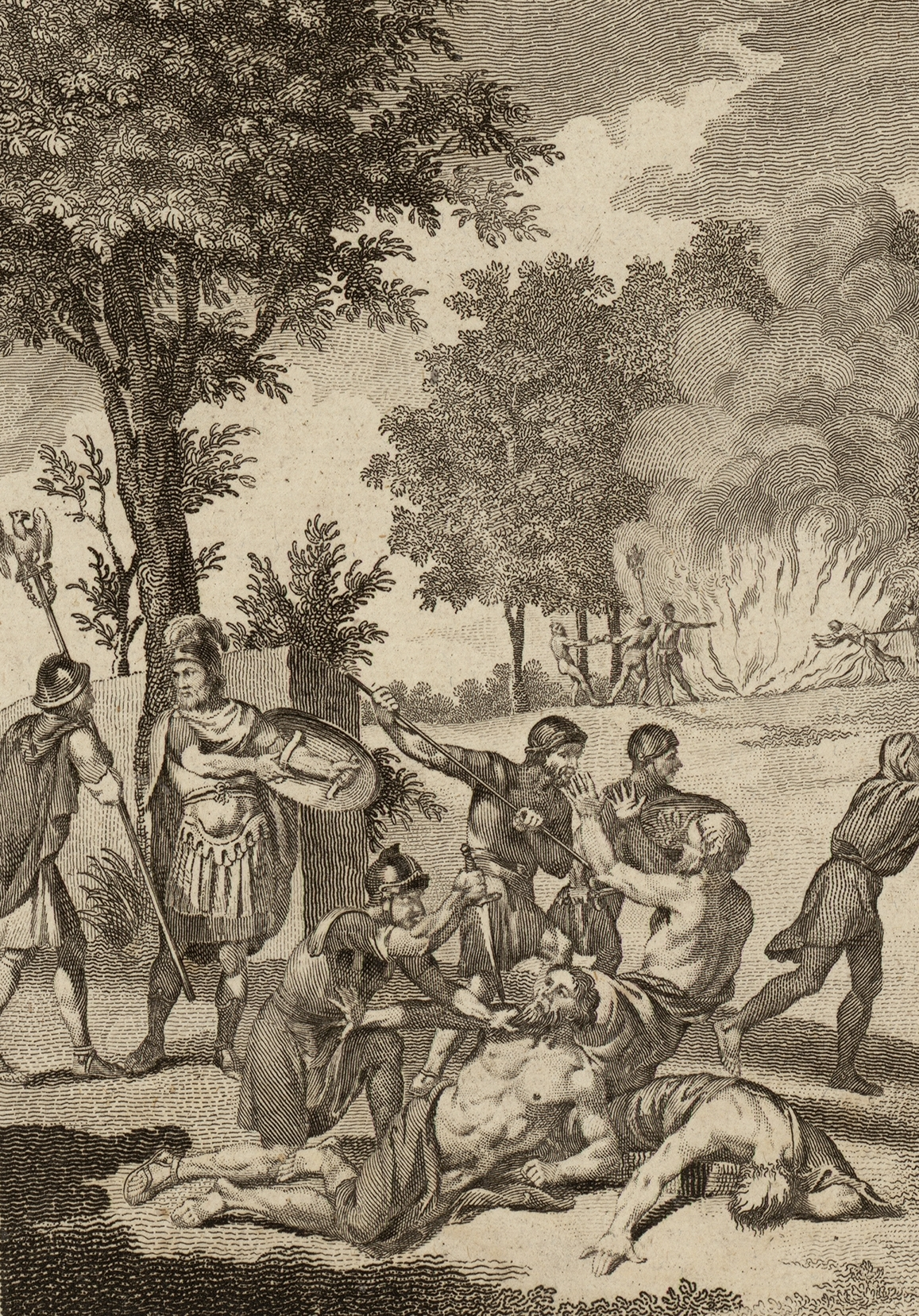
Roman troops attacking the druids on Anglesey, as described by Tacitus. A 19th-century imagining of the scene.

The earliest references present the druids as barbarian philosophers. Diogenes Laërtius (3rd century CE) reports that the druids and Semnotheoi of the Celts and Galatai were counted among the founders of philosophy, a notice he traces to the lost Magikos attributed to Aristotle and to the Successions of Philosophers of Sotion (2nd century BCE).

The first substantial descriptions belong to the 1st century BCE. Diodorus Siculus, Strabo and, in the fullest form, Julius Caesar, describe the druids among the peoples of Gaul. Cicero, a contemporary, records that he had personally known a Gaulish druid, Diviciacus of the Aedui. Diviciacus is the only druid known as an individual from other contexts, and Cicero may have placed material drawn from Posidonius in his mouth. (Note: It has been objected that Diviciacus, who according to Caesar conversed with him through an interpreter, is unlikely to have discussed natural philosophy with Cicero. Giuseppe Zecchini regarded this doubt as unwarranted.)

Under the early empire the geographer Pomponius Mela describes druidic teaching conducted over twenty years in caves or remote groves, while Pliny the Elder gives an account of the cutting of mistletoe and records Roman measures against the druids. The poet Lucan addresses the druids on the immortality of the soul and names three gods propitiated by blood. Tacitus provides the only notice of druids in Britain, at the Roman assault on Mona (Anglesey), and reports a druidic prophecy after the burning of the Capitol in 69 CE. In late antiquity Ammianus Marcellinus, drawing on the Augustan historian Timagenes, again groups the learned Gauls into three orders. The Historia Augusta reports encounters between 3rd-century emperors and Gaulish druidesses, episodes generally regarded as literary invention.

What these authors report about the druids is unevenly distributed. For those writing between the 1st century BCE and the 1st century CE, Jean-Marie Pailler has set it out in tabular form, a tick marking a feature an author ascribes to the druids, a question mark a doubtful attribution, and a blank the author's silence.

Features attributed to the druids by the classical authors, after Pailler (2008)
Author	Scholars	Seers	Magic	Mediators	Sacrifices	Arbiters	Punishment	Teaching	Single head	Secluded places	Britain
Posidonius (Note: Pailler notes that the question marks entered against Posidonius reflect extreme caution, and that in all likelihood these cells should be blank, since little can be securely recovered from his lost ethnography.)	✓	✓	?	✓	✓	?	✓	?	?	?	?
Diodorus Siculus	✓	✓		✓	✓		✓				
Cicero	✓	✓		✓							
Caesar	✓			✓	✓	✓	✓	✓	✓	✓	✓
Strabo											
Pomponius Mela	✓							✓		✓	
Lucan											
Pliny the Elder			✓		✓						✓

== Ancient druids ==
=== Functions and social role ===
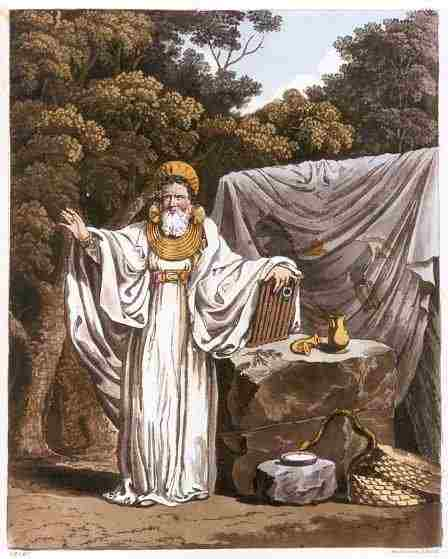
'An Arch Druid in His Judicial Habit', an imaginative illustration from S. R. Meyrick and C. H. Smith, The Costume of the Original Inhabitants of the British Islands (1815). The gold collar copies a Bronze Age Irish gorget.

Classical authors were most struck by the druids' elevated standing. The orator Dio Chrysostom likened their power to that of the Persian magi, the priests of Egypt and the Indian Brahmins, saying that kings could decide nothing without them. Diodorus and Strabo, drawing on Posidonius, describe the druids arbitrating public and private disputes and even halting armies drawn up for battle.

Caesar's account is the most detailed and the most discussed. He presents the druids as one of the two honoured classes of Gaul, alongside the equites ('horsemen'). According to Caesar, they conducted public and private sacrifices and expounded religious questions, judged nearly all disputes over crime, inheritance and boundaries, and could exclude the disobedient from sacrifice, the harshest of penalties. They had a single head who held office for life. Once a year they assembled at a consecrated place in the territory of the Carnutes, reckoned the centre of all Gaul. They were exempt from taxation and military service, and trained pupils who might remain in instruction for up to twenty years, memorising a great body of verse. Although they held it unlawful to commit their doctrine to writing, they used the Greek alphabet for other purposes, and their teaching was said to have originated in Britain.

Caesar's value as a source has been much debated. Ronald Hutton has emphasised that, although Caesar makes the druids a major power in Gaul, they are absent from his narrative of the conquest and from his account of the British expeditions, appearing only in his self-contained survey of Gaulish society, a silence shared by his literary continuator Aulus Hirtius. (Note: Not to be confused with Aulus Plautius who led the Roman invasion of Britain in 43 CE) Hutton reads the portrait as shaped to Caesar's ends, the druids being learned enough to make Gaul worth annexing, organised enough to pose a political threat, and barbaric enough to make its conquest a work of civilisation. Jean-Marie Pailler has emphasised that Caesar confines the druids to the excursus and says almost nothing of them in the campaign narrative, so that even Diviciacus, whose dealings he reports at length, is nowhere called a druid, a status known only from Cicero. (Note: Pailler reads this silence as deliberate: by keeping a theoretical druid within the excursus, Caesar neutralised the order's historical role while taking for himself the part of supreme arbiter it had held, for example when he settled the disputed election of the Aeduan chief magistrate in 52 BCE, acting in the manner of a druid.) Pailler suggests further that the druids may have been the first to conceive the idea of a unified Gaul, which Caesar afterwards made his own. Sean Dunham and Bernhard Maier have argued that most of the functions Caesar ascribes to the druids are in fact those of the Roman senatorial priesthoods, projected onto an alien people. Maier further notes that Caesar assimilated the druids to the college of pontifices, and that his statement that the Germans had no druids served his presentation of the Rhine as a natural frontier. Miranda Aldhouse-Green, by contrast, holds Caesar's account to be the richest and one of the most reliable, judging it inherently unlikely that he invented a fictional class system for peoples on whom other Roman officers were also reporting.

The learned class is described in three orders. Diodorus names bards, druids and manteis (seers), Strabo bards, ouateis and druids, and Ammianus, following Timagenes, bards, euhages and druids, three groups that trace back to Posidonius. The third term is a textual crux. The euhages (also miscopied eubages) of the Latin tradition is now generally taken as a scribal misreading of the Greek ouateis, the underlying Celtic word being *wātis, ancestor of Old Irish fáith 'prophet'. (Note: The reading arose when the sequence ΟΥΑΤΕΙΣ (ouateis) in an early Greek majuscule manuscript was miscopied as ΕΥΑΓΕΙΣ and construed as the plural of Greek euagḗs 'holy, pure'.)

=== Beliefs and teaching ===
The doctrine most often remarked upon was the immortality of the soul. Caesar reports that the druids taught that souls do not perish but pass from one person to another after death, and held that this teaching spurred courage by removing the fear of death. Diodorus made the comparison explicit, likening the belief to that of Pythagoras: souls were immortal and, after a fixed term of years, lived again in another body. Valerius Maximus and Lucan repeat the notice.

The comparison with Pythagoras is problematic. Maier observes that a doctrine of transmigration is nowhere attested outside the Posidonian line, since neither the earlier Greek authors nor the later insular tradition support it. The Pythagoreans, moreover, were vegetarian on account of the possibility of rebirth in animal form, whereas the Celts, by the testimony of the same ancient observers and of the archaeological evidence, consumed and sacrificed animals in quantity. The comparison may reflect Greek influence in the hinterland of Massalia, from which Posidonius conducted his enquiries, or merely a loose analogy drawn by philosophically educated Greeks. (Note: A few medieval Irish tales depict a figure passing through a succession of animal forms, but the motif functions as a narrative device spanning several generations and is nowhere presented as a pre-Christian doctrine of rebirth.)

The nature of druidic philosophy has divided modern scholars. Jan de Vries regarded the druids as closer to medicine-men, magicians and sorcerers, out of whose practice the reputation for wisdom grew. Jean-Louis Brunaux, by contrast, argued that they formed a genuine intellectual class whose authentic activities were philosophy in the broad sense, the exploration of every field of knowledge, together with law and teaching, and that their concerns brought them close to the Presocratic philosophers.

Caesar also attributes to the druids teaching on the stars and their motions, the size of the world and the earth, and the nature of things. Their reputed astronomical interest has been connected with the Coligny calendar, a Gallo-Roman bronze lunisolar calendar discovered in 1897, probably composed no earlier than the end of the 2nd century CE but reflecting older Gaulish models. Caesar adds that the Gauls claimed descent from Dis Pater and reckoned time by nights rather than days.

=== Rituals ===
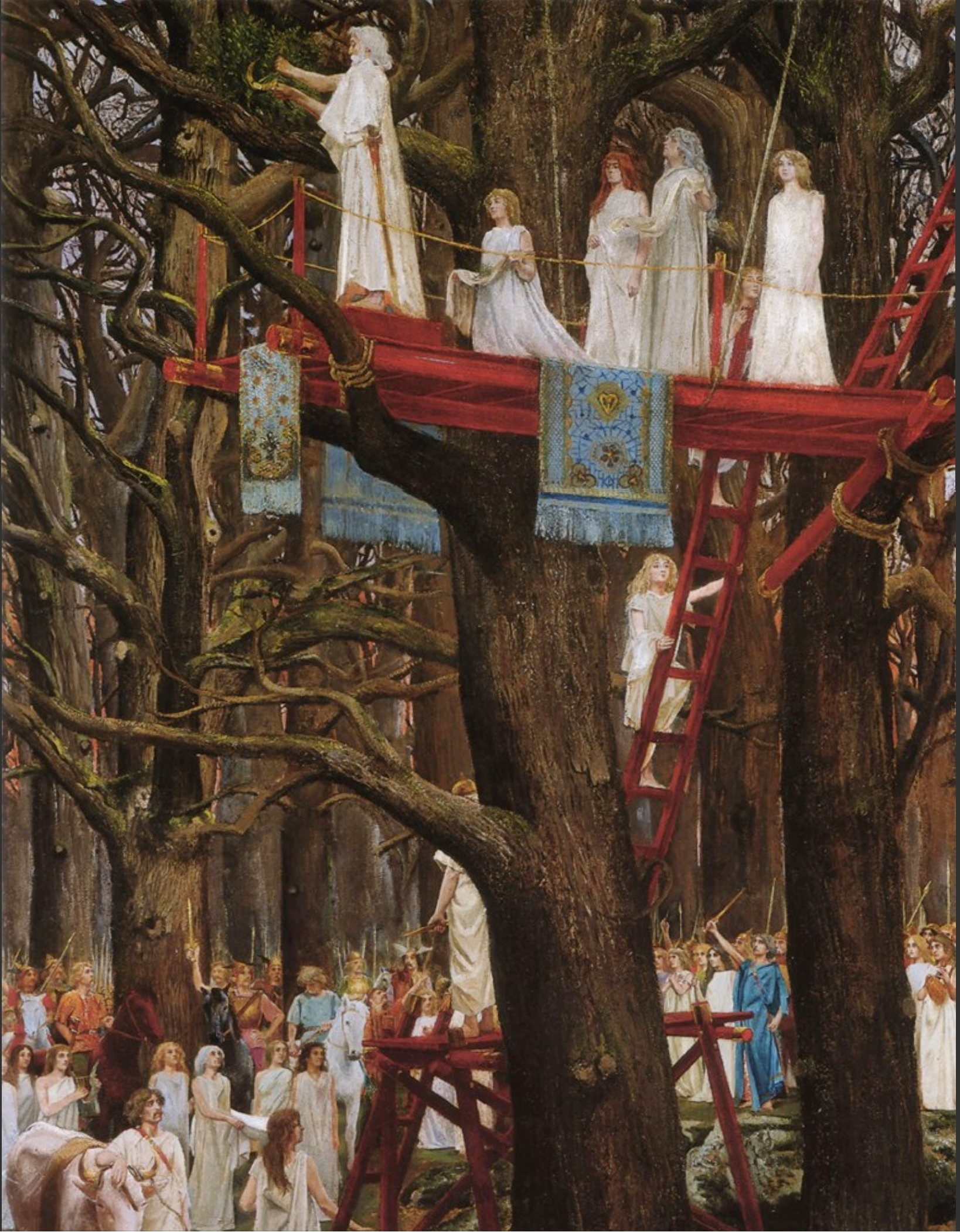
The oak and mistletoe ritual depicted by Henri-Paul Motte (1900)

Caesar and the Posidonian authors agree that no sacrifice was performed without a druid. Diodorus and Strabo describe divination from the death-throes of a human victim stabbed above the diaphragm, and Caesar reports that victims were burned inside a huge image of wickerwork, a practice later known as the wicker man. Lucan names three Gaulish gods propitiated by blood, Teutates, Esus and Taranis, whom the medieval Commenta Bernensia associate with distinct methods of killing. The reliability of these accounts is difficult to assess. Roman attitudes to human sacrifice were themselves more ambivalent than is often recognised, and the barbarity of the practice had an obvious propaganda value in justifying conquest.

The apparent contradiction between the druids' reputation for learning and their practice of human sacrifice mentioned by Caesar has been much discussed. Bruce Lincoln held that the two are not incompatible, and that the reports of sacrifice cannot be dismissed as mere Roman invention, since they go back to Greek sources, the ethnography of Posidonius and the account of Sopater, that pre-date any propagandistic motive. He read the rite as a serious ritual act rather than mere slaughter. Following Caesar, who reports that the druids preferred criminals as victims but would take the innocent when guilty men were lacking, Lincoln argues that those offered were as a rule condemned criminals and prisoners of war. (Note: Lincoln drew on later Irish texts to argue that Celtic sacrifice enacted a doctrine of creation. In one, preserved in the Cath Maige Tuired, 365 healing herbs grow from the dismembered body of the physician Miach. He took such stories to show that the world was held to have been made from the body of a dismembered victim, and that the sacrificial rite re-enacted this creation, so that it belonged to the physiologia, the study of the correspondences between body and cosmos that the classical authors attributed to the druids.)

The most influential description of a druidic rite is that of Pliny the Elder. Nothing, he writes, was more sacred to the druids than mistletoe growing on an oak. On the sixth day of the moon a white-robed priest climbed the tree and cut the mistletoe with a golden sickle, and it was caught in a white cloth, after which two white bulls were sacrificed. The plant was called 'all-healer' in the Gaulish tongue and was thought to confer fertility and to be a remedy against poisons. Maier notes that the golden sickle was more probably of gilded bronze, the essential point being the ritual avoidance of iron, and that Pliny's derivation of the name 'druid' from the Greek word for oak points to a Greek source. This single passage did more than any other to shape the later popular image of the druids.

An early second century BC account of druidic rituals, attributed to the now lost poems of Nicander but recorded by Tertullian of Carthage in his De Anima (chapter 57), recounts that druids would sleep close to the tombs of their chieftains. This would enable the spirits of the dead to visit the druids in their dreams and impart ancient wisdom and prophecy.

=== Roman suppression and decline ===
The classical sources record a sequence of Roman measures against the druids in the 1st century CE. Augustus forbade the druidic religion to Roman citizens. Under Tiberius a decree of the Senate was directed against the druids together with diviners and physicians. Claudius (AD 41–54) is said by Suetonius to have abolished the cruel and inhuman religion of the druids.

The reasons for this hostility have been debated. Whether Rome opposed the druids chiefly on account of human sacrifice, a view associated with Hugh Last, or for political reasons, has long divided scholars. Jane Webster argues that the decisive factor was the association Rome made between druids and anti-Roman prophecy, pointing to Augustus's burning of prophetic books and the repeated expulsion of diviners from Rome. Tacitus reports that after the burning of the Capitol in 69 CE the druids proclaimed the passing of world dominion to the peoples north of the Alps, and Webster reads this, together with the rising of Mariccus of the Boii, a man of humble birth who declared himself champion of Gaul and a god, as evidence of revitalisation movements in post-conquest Gaul. The Italian historian Giuseppe Zecchini likewise interpreted the druids as a focus of Celtic opposition to Rome.

Maier is more cautious. He finds no compelling evidence that an anti-Roman druidry survived into the later 1st century, and suggests that in such passages the word 'druid' may already mean no more than 'Gaulish diviner'. Given the rapid Romanisation of the Gaulish upper class, he judges that the pre-Roman druids came to a swift end with the organisation of the Gaulish provinces.

Whether Caesar's account was already an anachronism when written is a separate question. John Creighton argued that the druids were a declining force before the conquest, their traditional role as mediators coming into conflict with new power structures. Jane Webster, by contrast, holds that the decline was a post-conquest phenomenon.

=== Archaeology ===
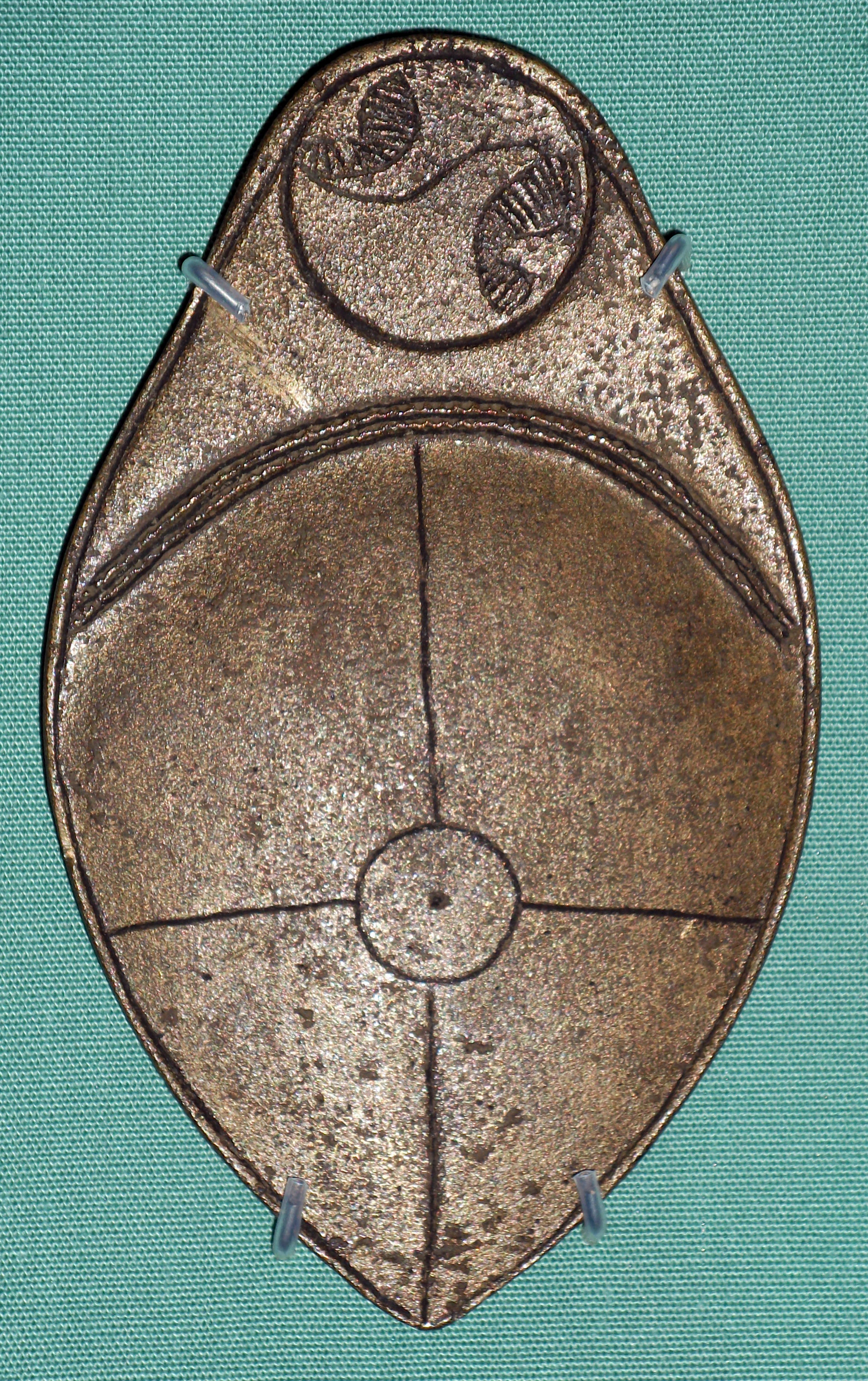
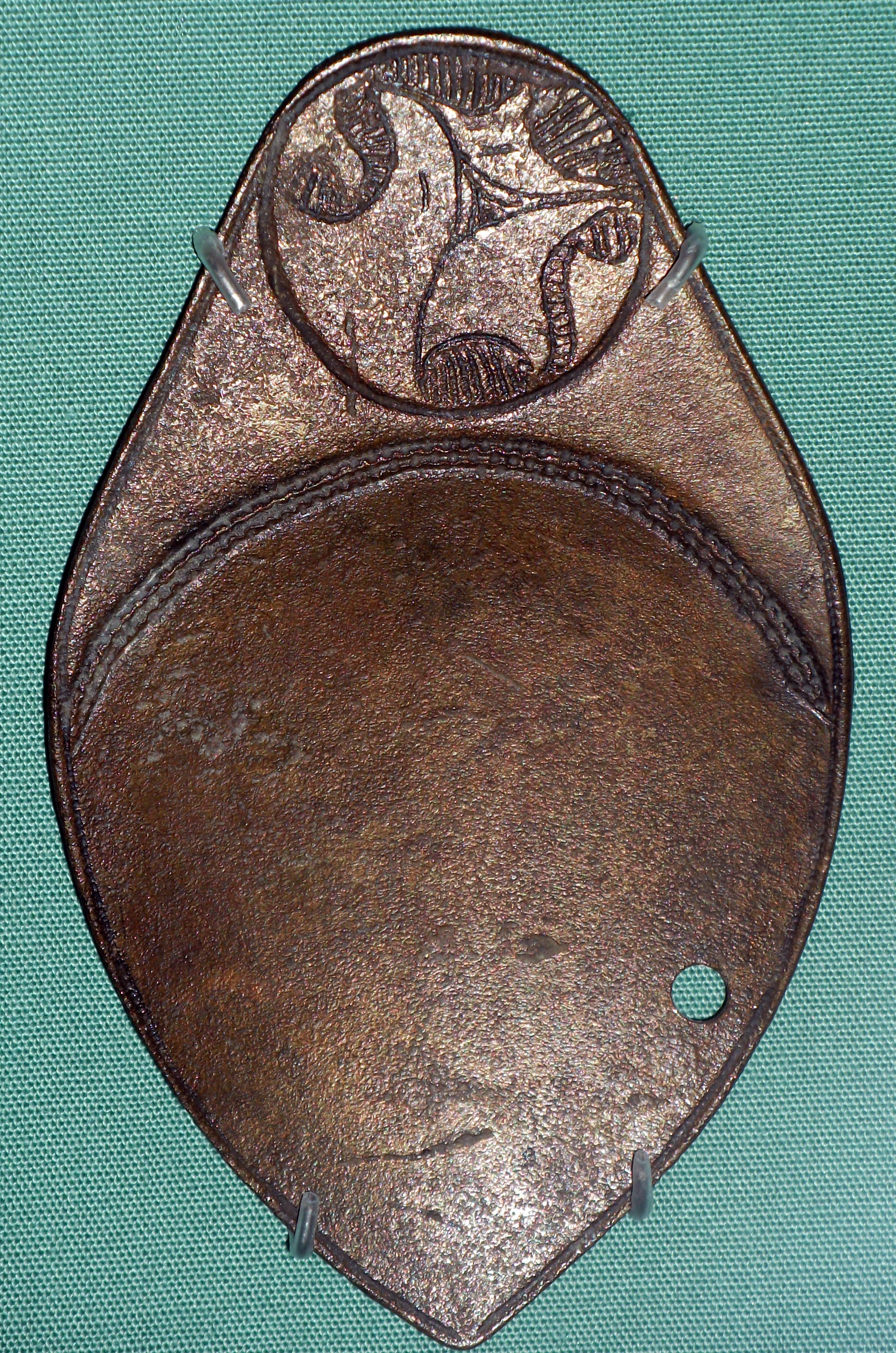
A pair of decorated bronze 'divining' spoons of the type found across Iron Age Britain, thought to have served in divinatory ritual.

The druids are archaeologically elusive. As T. D. Kendrick had observed already in 1927, a great deal of unfounded speculation has been written about them precisely because the direct evidence is so poor. Individual druids are unlikely ever to be identified in the archaeological record, and attempts to associate particular objects with them, whether astral symbols, the Coligny calendar or the Lindow Man bog body, remain mostly speculative.

What excavation has illuminated is the wider cult of pre-Roman Gaul. At Gournay-sur-Aronde, excavated from 1977 on the edge of the territory of the Bellovaci, a ditched enclosure yielded deposits of deliberately damaged weapons and pits in which cattle and other animals were sacrificed. Nearby Ribemont-sur-Ancre produced tens of thousands of human bones together with weapons, interpreted as the display of decapitated enemy warriors. Clear evidence of human sacrifice was found at Acy-Romance in the Ardennes. Maier stresses that these finds, like the Roman-period dedicatory inscriptions, contradict the older picture of a uniform Celtic religion and reveal strong regional diversity, and that the priests who must have officiated at such sites are nowhere named in the surviving written sources.

A few burials and objects from Britain have nonetheless been read as traces of ritual specialists, though none can be tied to druids in particular. A man buried at Mill Hill, Deal, in about 100 BCE wore a decorated bronze crown whose closest parallels are the ceremonial diadems of Romano-British temples, worn by priests. A high-status grave of about 50 to 60 CE at Stanway near Colchester, furnished with surgical instruments, a herbal infusion and a set of rods, has been read as that of a healer and possible diviner. Pairs of bronze 'divining' spoons, one plain and pierced, the other marked into quadrants, such as the pair from Castell Nadolig in west Wales, are thought to have served in divinatory ritual.

== Medieval Celtic druids ==
=== Ireland ===
Although Ireland was never part of the Roman Empire, medieval Irish literature preserves many references to druids (Old Irish druí), and these texts have often been drawn upon to reconstruct pre-Christian religion. Their evidential value is disputed, since the whole corpus reaches us through Christian clerics writing centuries after the conversion. The Christian shaping is clearest in hagiography. In the 7th-century Latin lives of Saint Patrick by Muirchú and Tírechán the druí is rendered by the Latin magus and cast as the pagan sorcerer who opposes the saint, on the model of the biblical magicians of Pharaoh. Kim McCone has shown that magus was the standard Latin equivalent of druí by the middle of the 7th century, and that Muirchú modelled his hostile druids on scriptural figures, the diviners of Nebuchadnezzar's court in the Book of Daniel and the magi whose report disturbed Herod in the Gospel of Matthew. Later texts frame native practice in the same way: the early 10th-century glossary Sanas Cormaic presents the divinatory rite imbas forosnai as a pagan custom banned by Saint Patrick, and even its explanation of the term is a folk-etymology.

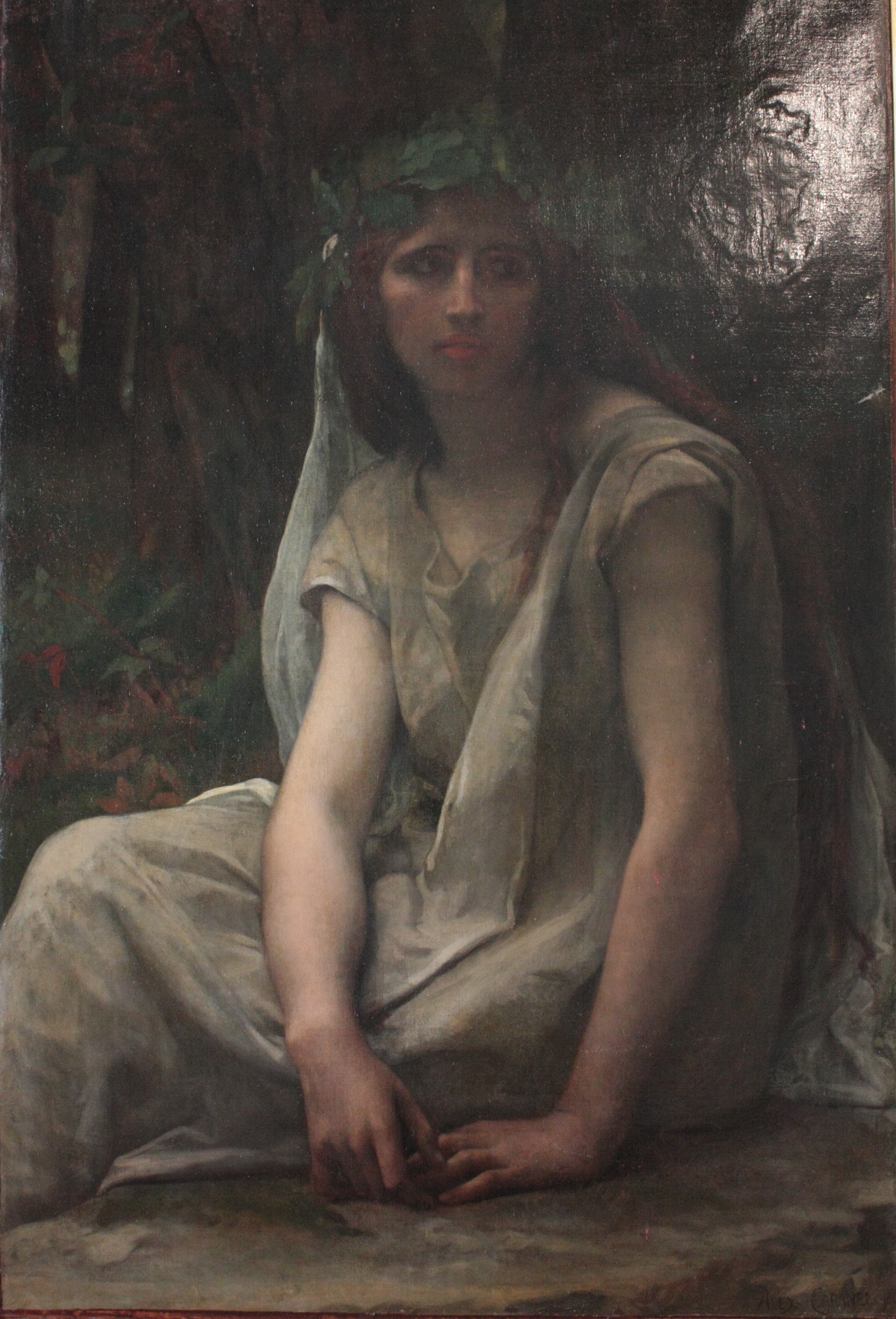
The Druidess, oil on canvas by Alexandre Cabanel (1823–1890), a 19th-century Romantic image of a woman druid.

Druids are prominent in the medieval Irish sagas, where they attend kings as prophets and workers of magic. The most fully drawn is Cathbad, chief druid at the court of Conchobar mac Nessa in the Ulster Cycle, who foretells the fate of Deirdre before her birth and prophesies that the young Cú Chulainn will win unmatched fame but a short life. To the same body of storytelling belong the Milesian poet Amairgin, remembered as the first poet of Ireland, and Mug Ruith, a blind druid of Munster. These figures too were reshaped by their Christian authors. Mug Ruith shows the process plainly: because he stood for paganism against the new religion, a redactor made him a pupil of Simon Magus, with whom he builds the flying roth rámach ('rowing wheel').

The early Irish law-tracts of the 7th and 8th centuries preserve a different picture, of the druí as an actual social figure. Fergus Kelly notes that tradition credited the pre-Christian druid with a status as high as that of his Gaulish and British counterparts, as priest, prophet, astrologer and teacher of the sons of nobles, in whose presence oaths were sworn. By the time of the law-texts the advance of Christianity had reduced him to a mere sorcerer. The tract Bretha Crólige allows the druid sick-maintenance only at the rate of a commoner (bóaire), whatever his rank, and his place in society was largely taken over by the poet (fili).

How much these sources preserve of genuine pre-Christian druidry is disputed. An older nativist tradition, since largely abandoned in Celtic studies, read the medieval material as authentic: Françoise Le Roux and Christian-Joseph Guyonvarc'h posited a fundamental unity of the druidic phenomenon across time and space, while Anne Ross took the sagas and the saints' Lives as evidence for a paganism still active in 6th-century Ireland, its rituals of shape-shifting, weather-working and sacrifice recoverable from them. McCone has argued instead that the literature owes far less to oral tradition, and much more to Christian Latin learning, than such theories assumed. Its picture of the pagan past served the ecclesiastical and secular patrons under whom it was composed, and the early Irish sources themselves deny any continuity between the medieval poet (fili) and the pagan druid. Maier likewise concludes that almost every statement in the medieval Irish sources on the druids must be qualified.

The earlier classical accounts of the druids said nothing of women, and female druids appear only in late or doubtful sources. The Historia Augusta, compiled in the 4th century CE, records Gaulish dryades ('druidesses') who prophesied to the emperors Alexander Severus, Aurelian and Diocletian, but those anecdotes are generally regarded as literary invention. By contrast, medieval Irish literature assigns the role to women freely, and James MacKillop lists several female druids among the figures of Irish tradition. In the Fenian Cycle, Bodhmall is a druidess and the aunt of Fionn mac Cumhaill, whom she raises. Birog is the druidess who helps Cian penetrate the tower of Balor and later saves the child of that union, Lug, from drowning. Tlachtga, a sorceress, was the daughter of the archdruid Mug Ruith, from whom she learned her secret knowledge, while Bé Chuille, a daughter of the woodland goddess Flidais, is reckoned among the most witch-like women of the Tuatha Dé Danann. The training of warriors could also fall to a druidess, as with Dornoll, who in Scotland instructed Cú Chulainn and other heroes in arms.

=== Wales ===
Druids are far rarer in medieval Welsh literature than in Irish, partly because the Welsh corpus is smaller and partly because it presents the same source-critical difficulties. Where they occur, an individual is called a dryw and certain figures derwydon, words credibly but not certainly rendered as 'druid' and 'druids'. The word dryw also means 'wren', a bird associated with magic. (Note: In both Irish and Welsh tradition the wren was reckoned one of the prophetic birds, ranked with the raven. In later Welsh custom it was hailed as the king of the birds and credited with supernatural powers, and the hunting of the wren at the turn of the year, in which the death of the 'king' was thought to bring fertility, may carry a trace of the older association.) Unlike the Irish druí, the derwydon function purely as prophets. The 10th-century poem Armes Prydein has a line usually translated "Druids foretell all that will happen", although its standard edition renders the word as 'wise men', and in the Book of Taliesin poem Kat Godeu the derwydon prophesy to King Arthur, foretelling Noah's Flood, the Crucifixion and Doomsday.

Ronald Hutton sets out two ways of reading these references. On one, they preserve a memory of ancient druidry that survived the centuries since the Roman conquest. On the other, the word was coined under the influence of contemporary Irish literature, in which druids figured prominently as diviners, so that the Welsh usage may be a borrowing from it. Hutton notes that Welsh texts show a far greater awareness of Ireland than the reverse, and that the borrowing is supported by the late Old English drȳ and drȳcræft ('magician' and 'magic'), which look like borrowings from the Irish draí and draídecht transmitted through the close contacts between England and Ireland from the 7th century onward.

A further passage occurs in the Historia Brittonum (820s), where the post-Roman ruler Vortigern summons magi who in turn defer to a council of the magi throughout Britain. The episode is sometimes read as a memory of a general assembly of druids in Britain answering to the one Caesar described in Gaul, though this is uncertain.

== Modern reception ==
=== Humanism and the Enlightenment ===
Renaissance scholars wove the druids into biblical genealogy and made them noble monotheist philosophers and ancestors legitimising national identity. The forged histories published by the Dominican Giovanni Nanni (Annius of Viterbo) from 1498 supplied a descent from Noah, and French and British antiquaries elaborated the theme through the 16th and 17th centuries. In the later 17th century John Aubrey first attributed stone circles such as Stonehenge and Avebury to the druids, and the deist John Toland cast them as a domineering priesthood that had governed the people through their credulity. William Stukeley, in works on Stonehenge (1740) and Avebury (1743), answered this reading by presenting the druids instead as exponents of a natural patriarchal religion close to Christianity, and popularised the megalithic identification. The association of megaliths with druids, although now known to be mistaken, since the monuments are of the Neolithic and Bronze Age and millennia older than the Iron Age Celts, proved highly durable.

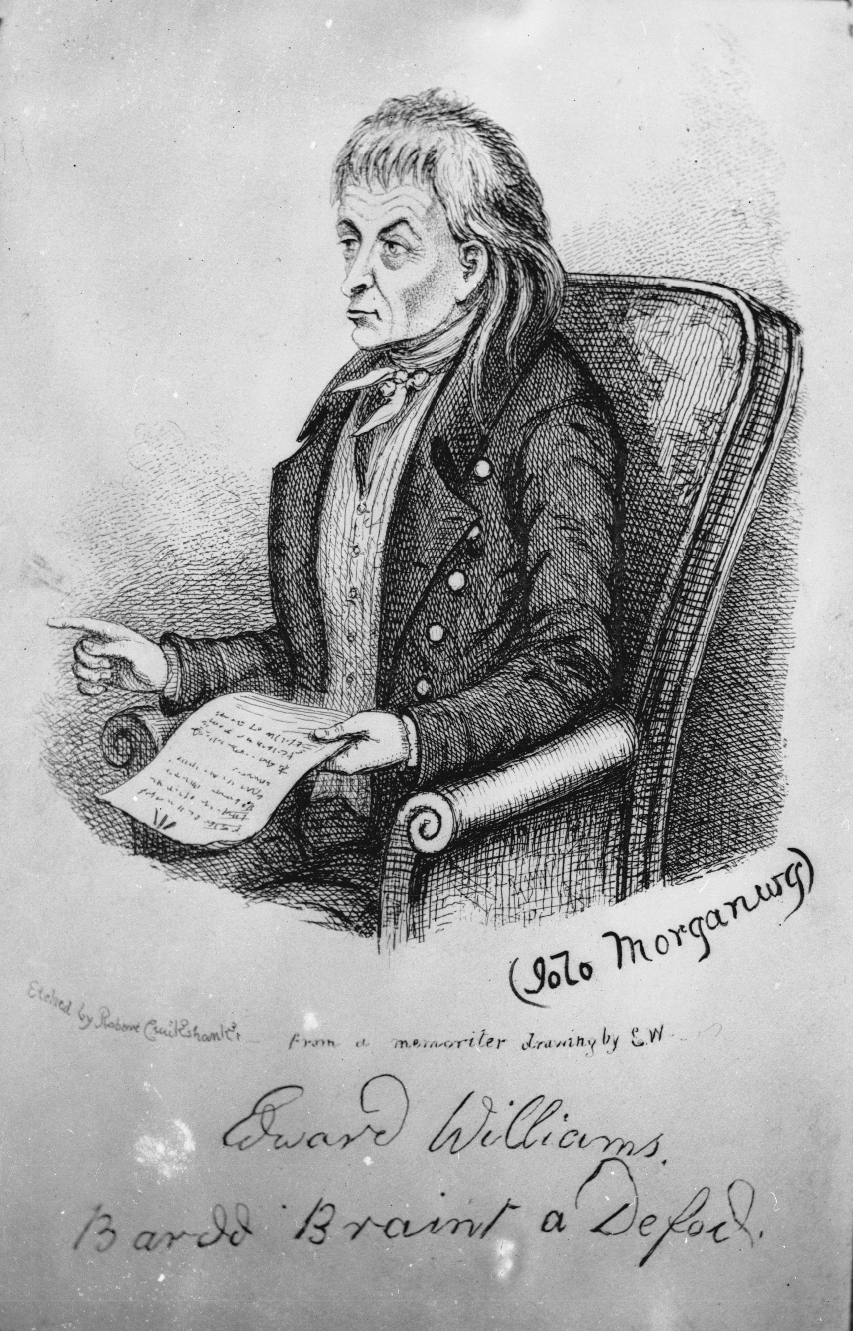
Edward Williams, known by his bardic name Iolo Morganwg, who invented the Gorsedd ritual in 1792.

The reception was not confined to Britain. On the Continent, and above all in France, humanists claimed the druids as the ancient philosophers of the Gauls, an ancestral pedigree that carried an ideological and national charge. Pierre de la Ramée and others pursued the theme through the 16th century, after Jean Le Fèvre had given it its first French statement in 1532, and Jacques Martin produced the first systematic study of Gaulish religion in the 1720s.

=== Romanticism and national revival ===
The European vogue for the Ossian poems from 1760 rekindled interest in the Celtic past, and the druid became a figure of Romantic and national feeling. In Wales, Edward Williams, known as Iolo Morganwg, invented in 1792 the Gorsedd Beirdd Ynys Prydain ('Assembly of the Bards of the Isle of Britain'), whose pseudo-ancient ritual, largely his own composition, survives in the National Eisteddfod, with its ascending ranks of ovates, bards and druids under an archdruid. William Blake made the druids part of his personal mythology, identifying the biblical patriarchs as druids, and in 1833 Vincenzo Bellini's opera Norma gave them a place in the operatic repertoire.

In France, where the ancient Gauls were being claimed as national ancestors, Chateaubriand gave the Romantic imagination its emblematic druidess in Velléda, the most poetic figure of his epic Les Martyrs (1809).

In Wales the movement went furthest. The Welsh had come only lately to place the druids at the centre of their national self-image, but through Iolo's legacy the bond between druidry and Welshness was consolidated across the 19th century, until the Welsh could be presented as the people of druidry above all others. The conviction that ancient druidic teaching lay concealed in the imagery of the medieval Welsh poets fed a powerful national legend that shaped Welsh writing about the druids throughout the century.

=== Modern Druidry ===
Fraternal and spiritual orders proliferated from the late 18th century, beginning with the Ancient Order of Druids, founded in 1781. In the 20th century the Order of Bards, Ovates and Druids, founded in 1964 by Ross Nichols, and comparable bodies drew on the antiquarian tradition, on Wicca and on modern esotericism. In their present form the druids figure as part of a Celtic neo-paganism. Two strands run through this modern druidry. Many of the orders were friendly societies on the model of the Freemasons, bound to charity and good conduct and barred from discussing religion or politics, the druidic element supplying little more than ceremonial and regalia. In the early 20th century George Watson MacGregor-Reid built a nature-based faith around the solstice ceremonies at Stonehenge, and modern pagan druidry descends chiefly from this current.

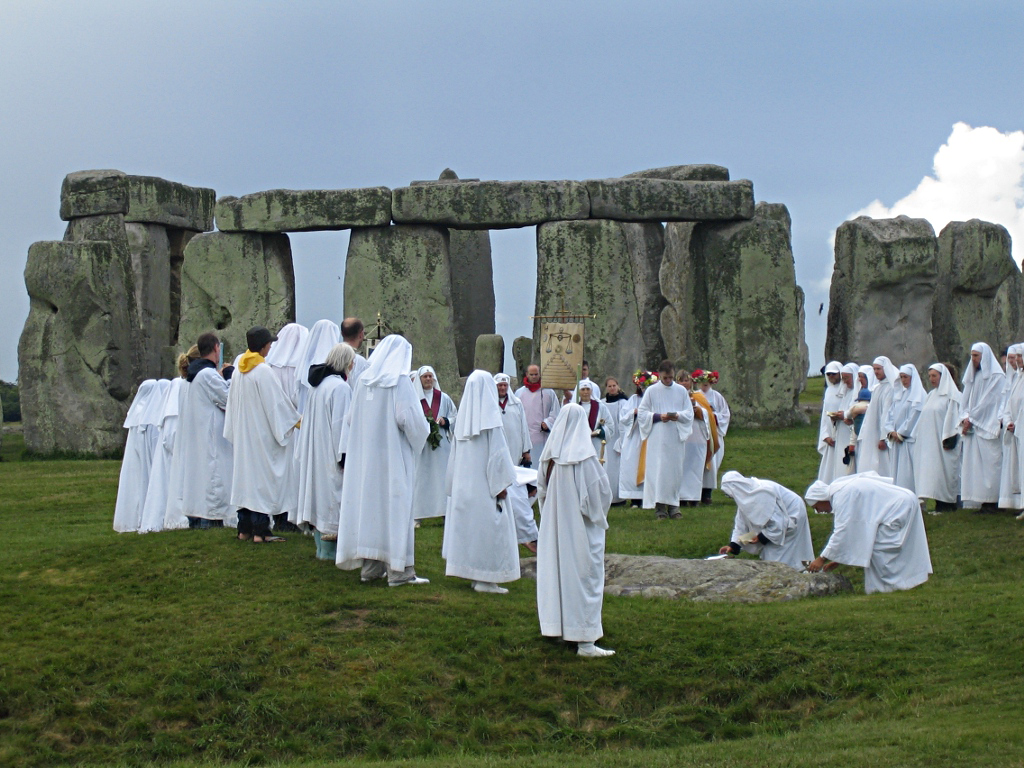
Druidic ritual at Stonehenge in Wiltshire, southern England

In its contemporary religious form Druidry venerates nature and is generally polytheistic, though it has no agreed body of doctrine. From interviews with practitioners, Michael T. Cooper found that they build their religious identity around three focal points: nature, held to be sacred and alive and taken as the pattern of life, with a strong sense of responsibility for the environment; the gods, approached by anyone from polytheists to pantheists and understood as immanent in the world; and the ancestors, revered as a link with the past and a source of guidance. Not all who call themselves Druids treat it as a religion in this sense. Contemporary Druidry ranges from a fully pagan nature religion to an eclectic philosophy open to the followers of any faith, and it is bound up with environmental concern and a wider counter-culture, answering the strains of modern urban life with images drawn from the distant past.

None of this is a survival of ancient practice. Modern druidry is a reconstruction drawn from the antiquarian tradition and later ideas, and Hutton observes that its adherents adopted Stonehenge as their temple just as archaeologists were showing that the ancient druids could have had no part in it. Maier concludes that the enduring fascination of the druids rests not on locating them in a pure world of fantasy but on the conviction of their historicity, and that the very vocabulary through which they are approached betrays its roots in Graeco-Roman and Judaeo-Christian traditions, which cannot be set aside or replaced by the druids' own perspective.

=== Scholarship ===
19th-century scholarship pictured the druids in several competing ways. In Britain the boldest readings were comparative and diffusionist. A school of orientalists, emboldened by the conquest of India, derived the druids from the Brahmins: Reuben Burrow announced in 1790 that the British druids had been Brahmins beyond all doubt, and Thomas Maurice traced their doctrine, their initiatory rites in caves and even the word druid itself to India and the wider East. Others made them the westernmost agents of a seafaring Phoenician civilisation. A dissenting minority, led by the antiquary John Pinkerton, rejected the whole construction as nonsense and pointed to the fact that megaliths as impressive as the British stood in Scandinavia, where no druids had ever been reported. In France the druids were absorbed into a national history of the ancient Gauls. Amédée Thierry supplied that history with its narrative, and Henri Martin placed the druids at its centre, treating them not as mere priests but as the scholars, judges, teachers and priests of the nation's ancestors and the exponents of a native pantheism, whose doctrine he was at pains to distinguish from that of the eastern religions.

This inherited picture broke down after about 1860. In Wales, Thomas Stephens and D. W. Nash separated the genuine medieval bardic literature from the druidic matter that had gathered around it, and the comparative philology of John Rhys placed the Celtic evidence on a new footing, so that the Romantic druid rapidly lost its scholarly standing. The reassessment was carried further in the 20th century. In The Druids (1927) T. D. Kendrick set out to replace what he called "a prodigious amount of rubbish" with a documented summary of fact, denying any connection between the druids and the megalithic monuments and any survival of druidic tradition across the intervening centuries. As the subject passed to archaeologists, opinion divided over the antiquity of the druids. Stuart Piggott, in his own The Druids (1968), treated them strictly as a phenomenon of the Iron Age and denied them any link with the far older monuments, whereas Glyn Daniel in 1972, and after him Euan MacKie and Anne Ross, reopened that link by arguing that a priestly class had already served the builders of the monuments. More recently Miranda Aldhouse-Green has placed the druids within a broad tradition of northern European shamanism reaching back to the Palaeolithic, an argument that Ronald Hutton finds stimulating but inconclusive, since its criteria are too diffuse to be secure.

The present consensus is a cautious one. The druids are accepted as a real priestly and learned order of the Iron Age Celtic peoples rather than a Roman invention, though the surviving evidence is sparse and one-sided, and the older ideas about megalith-building and an unbroken tradition from ancient to medieval druids have been largely abandoned. How far the druids can be reconstructed from that evidence remains disputed. Aldhouse-Green treats Caesar's account as rich and broadly reliable and rebuilds a substantial priesthood from it, whereas Hutton stresses how little can be established with confidence, holding that the successive images of the druids reveal more about the ages that reimagined them than about the ancient priesthood. A separate controversy turned on the medieval Irish and Welsh sources. Against a long nativist orthodoxy, which read the vernacular literature as a barely altered store of pre-Christian oral tradition, the revisionist school marked by Kim McCone's Pagan Past and Christian Present (1990) held that this literature was the work of Christian monasteries and bore a deep clerical imprint, so that it cannot be read as a direct record of pagan antiquity, the medieval druids included.

=== Fantasy and pop culture ===
Druids are recurring magical characters in fantasy literature, film, television, tabletop games, and video games. They are commonly associated with nature, forests, plants, and animals, and are often portrayed as guardians or practitioners of nature-based magic. In fantasy settings, druids are frequently depicted as possessing supernatural abilities, particularly shapeshifting, allowing them to transform into animals such as wolves, bears, birds, and other creatures. Some fictional druids can take the form of owls.

== See also ==
- Ancient Celtic religion
- Vates
- Bard
- Vergobret
