= Madonna of the Rose =

Madonna of the Rose may refer to:

- Madonna of the Rose (Orsanmichele)
- Madonna of the Rose (Parmigianino)
- Madonna of the Rose (Raphael)

== See also ==
- Madonna of the Roses
- Madonna of the Rose Bower (Lochner)
- Madonna of the Rose Bower (Schongauer)
