= Vates =

Class of seers in ancient Celtic society

Vates (Celtic: *wātis 'seer, sooth-sayer'; Greek: ouáteis, οὐάτεις) were a class of seers and sacrificers among the ancient Gauls. Greek and Roman writers describe them as one of three specially honoured groups in Gaulish society, ranked beside the bards and the druids. They conducted sacrifices, foretold the future, and concerned themselves with the natural world. The account goes back to the lost Gaulish ethnography of the Greek philosopher Posidonius. It survives in three later writers, Diodorus Siculus, Strabo and Ammianus Marcellinus, who name and describe the class in terms that do not fully agree. The native word behind the Greek and Latin forms is reconstructed as Proto-Celtic *wātis, also continued by Old Irish fáith ('seer, prophet').

== Name and etymology ==
=== Attestations ===
The Gaulish class is mentioned by Diodorus Siculus (1st century BC) and Strabo (1st century AD) and Ammianus (4th century AD), who all drew on the lost Gaulish ethnography of Posidonius (c. 135–51 BC). Of the three authors, only Strabo gives what appears to be its native name, under the Greek plural οὐάτεις (ouáteis). Diodorus, drawing on the same source, uses the Greek word for 'seers', mánteis (μάντεις). Ammianus, who depends on the historian Timagenes, has the Latinised form euhages, which the manuscripts and early editions also transmit as eubages. (Note: The chief manuscript reading is euhagis; the editions and other witnesses give euhagus, eubages, euages, and eubagi, among others.)

How the three renderings relate, and which best reflects the Gaulish term, has been argued since the 19th century. Most scholars hold that Posidonius used a single Celtic word, which his excerptors glossed in different ways, so that Diodorus's mánteis, Strabo's ouáteis and Ammanius's euhages designate the same group. (Note: An older view, held by Alfred Klotz, that Posidonius named only two classes, druids and bards, and that the term for a third group arose through textual corruption, is rejected by recent scholarship.) The form euhages is usually explained as a corruption or gloss of ouáteis, perhaps influenced by the Greek adjective heuageis (εὐαγεῖς; 'pure, holy'). The suggestion that euhages is itself a Gaulish word, as advanced by Jean-Louis Brunaux, has been rejected by Bernhard Maier for want of a credible Celtic etymology.

Lucan and Pliny the Elder use the word vātēs in its ordinary Latin sense and do not attest the Gaulish word. In Lucan the word is applied to the bards, and Pliny uses it of the seers and healers grouped with the druids.

=== Etymology ===
The Greek word ouáteis (οὐάτεις) is derived from Proto-Celtic *wātis ('seer, sooth-sayer'), also continued in Old Irish fáith ('seer, prophet') and in the Gaulish theonym Uatiounos (< wātio-mno-, 'who prophesies'). A related form *wātus ('poetic inspiration') gave way to Gaulish uatus, Old Irish fáth and Welsh gwawd ('song, poem, satire').

The same root appears in Germanic *wōđaz ('possessed, inspired, delirious, raging'), giving Gothic woþs ('possessed'), Old Norse óðr ('mind, wit, soul, sense'; also 'song, poetry') and Old High German wuot ('frenzy'), together with the divine name *Wōðanaz (Old Norse Óðinn, Old English Wōden, Old High German Wuotan). Koch and Kroonen treat *wōđaz and *wātis as religious terms shared by Germanic and Celtic, going back to a common form *uoh₂-tós ~ *ueh₂-tus ('god-inspired').

The Latin vātēs ('seer, prophet, poet') corresponds closely in form and meaning to the Celtic word, but their relation is disputed. Michiel de Vaan and Ranko Matasović take them as cognates ultimately descended from a Proto-Indo-European word *(h)ueh₂-tis ('prophet, seer'). Conversely, Xavier Delamarre, Jan de Vries, Guus Kroonen, and John T. Koch regard Latin vātēs as an early loan from Gaulish.

== Sources ==
The three surviving ancient descriptions all derive from Posidonius (c. 135–51 BC), whose treatment of Gaul is lost but can be partly recovered from later quotation. Strabo and Diodorus drew on him directly. Ammianus took his account from Timagenes, who had himself used Posidonius. None of the three reproduces the original in full, and their excerpts cannot be brought wholly into agreement. Strabo in particular abridges his source heavily and adds his own, markedly pro-Roman, judgement.

=== Strabo ===
Among all the Gallic peoples, generally speaking, there are three sets of men who are held in exceptional honour; the Bards, the Vates (Οὐάτεις) and the Druids. The Bards are singers and poets; the Vates, diviners and natural philosophers; while the Druids, in addition to natural philosophy, study also moral philosophy.

— Strabo, Geographica, IV.4.4.

=== Diodorus ===
Among [the Gauls] are also to be found lyric poets whom they call Bards ... and men learned in religious affairs ... called by them Druids. The Gauls likewise make use of diviners (μάντεσιν), accounting them worthy of high approbation, and these men foretell the future by means of the flight or cries of birds and of the slaughter of sacred animals, and they have all the multitude subservient to them.

— Diodorus, Bibliotheca historica, V.31.3.

=== Ammnianus ===
Throughout [Gaul] men gradually grew civilised and the study of the liberal arts flourished, initiated by the Bards, the Euhages and the Druids. Now, the Bards sang to the sweet strains of the lyre the valorous deeds of famous men composed in heroic erse, but the Euhages, investigating the sublime, attempted to explain the secret laws of nature.

— Ammnianus, Res gestae, XV.9.8.

=== Caesar ===
Julius Caesar, who knew Gaul at first hand and who also drew on Posidonius, names only the druids, treating the equites and the plebs as the other divisions of society. However, his silence on a separate order of seers is not seen by scholars as evidence of absence of such a class. Françoise Le Roux, Christian-Joseph Guyonvarc'h and Giuseppe Zecchini hold that Caesar gathered the various cult functionaries under the single term druid.

== Role and interpretation ==
According to Strabo the vates were "sacrificers and natural philosophers" (ἱεροποιοὶ καὶ φυσιολόγοι). Diodorus says the diviners foretold the future by the observation of birds and by the sacrifice of victims, and that the whole people obeyed them. In Ammianus the euhages sought to "reveal the sublime laws of nature." The natural philosophy (physiología) credited to the vates overlapped with that of the druids, and the sources assign it now to one group, now to the other. Jean-Louis Brunaux understands it as a knowledge of the natural world that took in astronomy and medicine. Jan de Vries read it more narrowly, as the calendrical and astronomical lore needed to fix the right day for a sacrifice rather than disinterested science.

The diviner's work has been read as a form of inspired mediation. De Vries took the vates to have sought the will of the gods in a heightened state, a task that for him went beyond foretelling events to include learning whether the gods looked favourably on a sacrifice about to be made. He may have tied this inspiration to poetic speech, since the related Welsh gwawd means 'poem'. Xavier Delamarre also sees the meaning of the related words fethid ('sees, observes') and guetid ('say'), in Old Irish and Old Welsh, as pointing to a divinatory practice that combined observation of nature with poetic expression.

How the vates stood to the druids cannot be fixed with precision. Their competences overlap, and no clear line is drawn between them. Bernhard Maier concludes that the interchangeability of the terms shows the vates stood close to the druids in Posidonius's account, but that any sharper definition of their function is speculative. Françoise Le Roux and Christian-Joseph Guyonvarc'h argue further that the Gaulish priesthood formed a single class, within which the bards and the vates were specialists who could all be called druids.

Diodorus places among the diviners' methods a form of divination by human sacrifice. A consecrated man was struck down and the future read from his death, a rite the Gauls were said never to perform without a druid. Diodorus explains that sacrifice could reach the gods only through men who knew the divine nature and who were held to speak, as it were, the gods' own language. (Note: Strabo and Diodorus report that the victim was stabbed and that omens were taken from the way he fell, from his convulsions, and from the flow of his blood.) The reliability of the account is debated. Strabo reports the rite in the past tense, since Rome had by then suppressed it, and both he and Diodorus dwell on it mainly to brand the cruelty of the Gauls. A closely similar divination from a slain captive recurs in Posidonian accounts of the Lusitanians and the Cimbri. The literary stress on human sacrifice also does not align with the archaeological evidence, which show that animal sacrifice was far more common. Even so, Andreas Hofeneder regards the practice itself as beyond doubt, an exceptional form of divination kept for grave occasions.

== Celtic parallels ==
The Celtic *wātis is directly continued by Old Irish fáith ('seer, prophet'). The threefold Gaulish scheme of bardos, uáteis and druides has a counterpart in the early Irish triad of bard, fáith, and druí.

Celtic languages have another word for 'seer', *weletos (from another root *wel-o- 'to see'), which is continued in Gaulish uelets, Old Irish filed (the genitive form of filí) and Middle Welsh gwelet. (Note: The ancient Germanic Weleda, the name of a seeress, is probably a borrowing from Gaulish *ueletā ('seeress').) On this basis, Jan de Vries proposed to connect the Gaulish vates with the Irish poet-seer filí. However, because the fili absorbed much of the druidic role after the conversion to Christianity, the Irish evidence reflects a later and altered situation and is of limited value for reconstructing the Gaulish class. A further word for 'seeress', *widlmā (from *wid- 'to see, to know'), is the ancestor of Gaulish uidluas, Old Irish fedelm and Welsh gwyddon.

Attempts to set the vates within a wider Indo-European framework have stayed cautious. The one firmly based comparison is with Germanic, where Jan de Vries and John T. Koch see in the vates and in the god *Wōðanaz a shared heritage of inspired prophecy and poetry. Broader reconstructions relating the Celtic priesthood to the Vedic priestly order are regarded as speculative.

== Modern usage ==
The ovate is one of the three grades of the Order of Bards, Ovates and Druids, a neo-druidic order founded in England in 1964, ranking between the bard and the druid.

The ovate is also one of the three grades of the Welsh Gorsedd of bards, the society that conducts the ceremonies of the National Eisteddfod of Wales. The Gorsedd is not a neo-druidic body but a fellowship for the Welsh language and Welsh culture. Its rites were composed in 1792 by Iolo Morganwg as a reconstruction of druidism, much of it his own invention.
