= Bard =

Poet and singer in Celtic societies

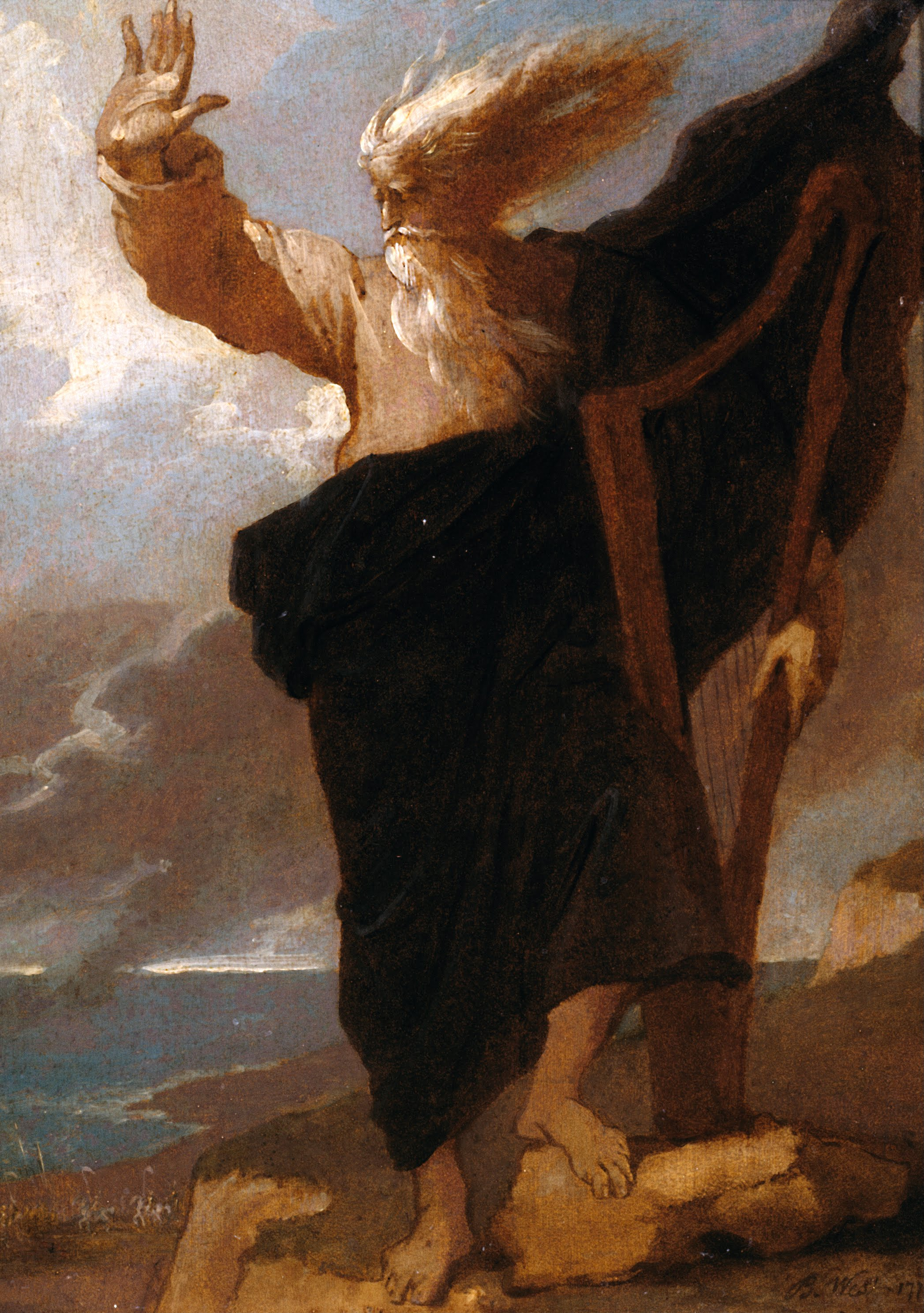
The Bard (1778) by Benjamin West

A bard was a poet and singer who composed and performed verse in the service of a patron, a calling attested among the ancient Celts and continued in the medieval Celtic-speaking world. The ancient bard is known from Greek and Roman authors writing about Gaul between the 1st century BC and the 4th century AD, who count the bards, with the druids and the vates, among the learned orders of Gaulish society. They describe them singing the praises of chieftains, and the satire of their rivals, to an instrument resembling the lyre. The name goes back to the Proto-Celtic noun *bardos (transl. praise-maker), the source of Old Irish bard, Welsh bardd, and the related forms in the other Celtic languages.

The word and the calling survived in medieval Ireland, Wales, Scotland and Brittany, where praise and satire of rulers remained central to the poet's office. The word bard had also been extended, inaccurately, to the poets and singers of the Germanic world, and it now serves loosely for poets in general, most familiarly as "the Bard" for William Shakespeare.

== Etymology ==
The English term bard is a loanword from the Gaelic bàrd and Irish bàrd. Linguistically related terms appear in various Celtic languages, including Gaulish bardo- ('bard, poet'), Middle Irish bard ('bard, poet'), Middle Welsh bardd ('singer, poet'), Middle Breton barz ('minstrel'), and Old Cornish barth ('jester').

The ancient Gaulish *bardos is attested as bardus (sing.) in Latin and as bárdoi (plur.) in Ancient Greek. It is also found as a stem in the compound words bardo-cucullus ('bard's hood'), bardo-magus ('field of the bard'), barditus (a song to fire soldiers), and in bardala ('crested lark', a singing bird).

All of these terms come from the Proto-Celtic noun *bardos ('poet-singer, minstrel'), itself derived, with regular Celtic sound shift *gʷ > *b, from the Proto-Indo-European (PIE) compound *gʷrH-dʰh₁-o-s, which literally means 'praise-maker'. It is cognate with Sanskrit: gṛṇā́ti ('calls', 'praise'), Latin: grātus ('grateful', 'pleasant', 'delightful'), Lithuanian: gìrti ('praise'), and Armenian: kardam ('raise voice').

Another Celtic word for a 'poet', *kwrityos, is attested in Gaulish pritios, Old Irish crithe, Middle Welsh prydydd, and Old Cornish pridit. It derives from Proto-Celtic *kwritus ('magical transformation, shape'), itself from PIE *k^{w}er- ('to make, cause'). Further words related to the Celtic art of poetry can also be reconstructed, including *natu- ('poem, song, incantation'), *marwo-natu- ('funerary poem, eulogy'), *dawnā ('poem') and *awe- ('poetic inspiration'), although it is uncertain if they can be linked to the ancient bards.

== Classical accounts ==
The earliest descriptions of the bard are given by Greek and Roman authors writing about Gaul between the 1st century BC and the 4th century AD. The fullest go back to the lost history of Posidonius, who travelled in southern Gaul in the early 1st century BC and whose account of the Gauls survives only through later writers who excerpted it, chiefly Diodorus Siculus, Strabo, and Athenaeus. Further notices appear in Ammianus Marcellinus, who drew on the lost work of Timagenes, in the poet Lucan, in Appian, and in the Latin lexicographical tradition. These writers describe the bards as professional poet-singers in the service of chieftains, and place them, together with the druids and the vates, among the learned orders of Gaulish society.

=== Sources ===
Diodorus Siculus, writing in the later 1st century BC, reports that the Gauls have lyric poets called bards who sing to instruments resembling lyres, some of their songs in praise and others in mockery. A passage of Athenaeus that cites Posidonius likewise describes praise-singers among the Celts, called bards, who recite their eulogies in song before the assembled company. Strabo, who also drew on Posidonius for his account of Gaul, names the bards among the three classes held in particular honour by all the Gauls, alongside the vates and the druids, and defines the bards as singers and poets.

The later notices repeat this picture. Ammianus Marcellinus, drawing on Timagenes, lists the bards with the euhages and the druids and states that the bards sang the brave deeds of famous men in heroic verse. (Note: Ammianus's euhages is generally taken as a garbled form, transmitted through Greek, of the word that Strabo renders ouateis and Latin authors vates.) The poet Lucan, in the first book of the Pharsalia, addresses the bards directly as those who, through their praises, send into long ages the brave souls of men slain in war. (Note: In the same lines Lucan applies the word vates to the bards themselves, in apposition, rather than to the separate class of seers.) The Latin lexicographical tradition preserves the same sense: the epitome by Paulus Diaconus of Festus's De verborum significatu explains bardus as the Gaulish word for a singer who sings the praises of brave men. (Note: The medieval scholia on Lucan wrongly explain bardi as the name of a Germanic people (bardi Germaniae gens). The Festus epitome carries the same false derivation, a gente Bardorum, 'from the people of the Bardi'.)

Because Diodorus, Strabo, and the Posidonian passages of Athenaeus descend from a single source, they are not independent witnesses but one tradition. Caesar, who described the druids at length, does not mention the bards or the vates at all, a silence that has been read as a sign that his account of Gaul did not depend on Posidonius.

=== Craft and status ===
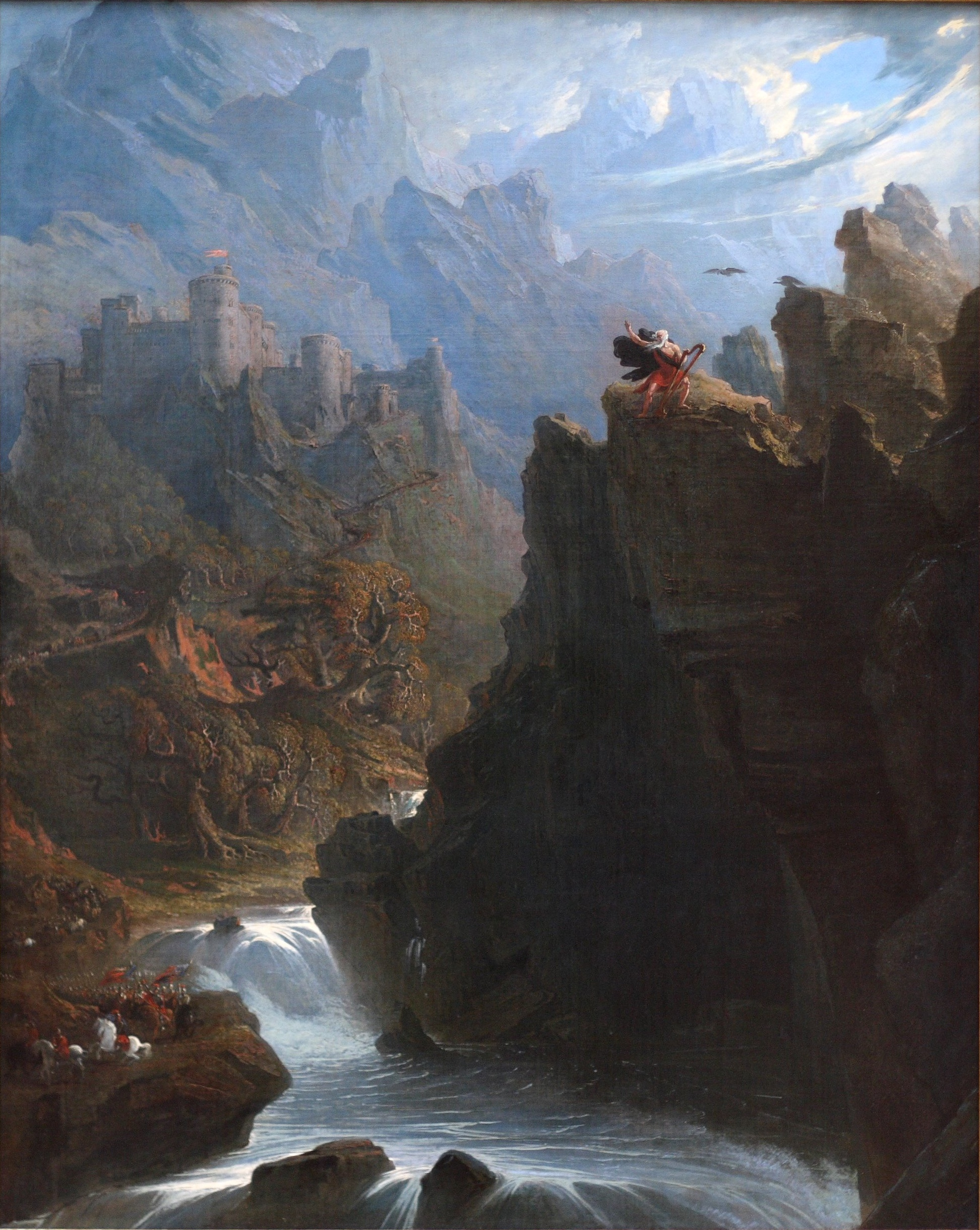
The Bard (c. 1817), by John Martin

The sources agree on what the bard did. His central activity was praise poetry, along with satire or mockery, a polarity already drawn by Diodorus. The power to raise or lower a patron's standing gave the most successful bards a privileged and well-paid position, and later Irish sources confirm that the bard's satire was feared by the nobility.

The bard performed to a stringed instrument. Diodorus compares it to a lyre, and Miranda Aldhouse-Green relates this notice to surviving tuning-pegs for instruments of the kind. The reward such performance could bring is illustrated by the feast of the Arvernian Louernios, described by Posidonius through Athenaeus. A Celtic poet, generally identified as a bard, arrived after the feast had ended and sang of the king's greatness while lamenting his own late arrival. Louernios, pleased, threw him a bag of gold, whereupon the poet sang a second song declaring that even the tracks of the king's chariot gave gold and benefits to men.

The bard also had a part in public affairs. Appian's account of an embassy sent to the Romans by the Arvernian king Bituitus describes a musician in the envoy's train who sang, in the barbarian manner, the praises first of the king, then of his people, and then of the envoy himself, his birth, his courage, and his wealth, which Appian gives as the reason that envoys of rank took such singers with them. (Note: Appian calls Bituitus king of the Allobroges. He was king of the Arverni, as Orosius correctly records.) Diodorus adds that the bards, together with the druids, could step between two armies drawn up for battle and bring them to a halt.

=== Learned triad ===
In Diodorus, Strabo, and Ammianus the bards form one of three honoured classes, the others being the vates (seers) and the druids. Of the three, the druids held the highest standing, credited with natural and moral philosophy and with a part in every sacrifice, while the bards were the poets and the seers the diviners. The same threefold division, with the bard set beside a seer (fáith) and a druid (druí), recurs in early medieval Ireland.

== Medieval Celtic bards ==
The word and the calling outlived the Roman conquest in the Celtic-speaking lands of the British Isles, but the term came to be used very differently in the two main traditions. In medieval Wales bardd stayed the ordinary and prestigious word for a poet, whereas in medieval Ireland bard was kept for a lower grade of poet, ranked below the file. In both countries the praise, and the satire of rulers remained at the centre of the professional poet's office.

=== Wales ===
In Welsh, bardd was the usual word for any poet, and the office of court poet was an old and prestigious one. The eulogistic and elegiac verse attributed to Aneirin and Taliesin is dated to the 6th century, and the poets of the great age of bardic eulogy, the Gogynfeirdd or Poets of the Princes of the 12th and 13th centuries, set themselves consciously in that tradition, composing praise and elegy for the princes and noblemen of independent Wales. After the death of Llywelyn ap Gruffudd in 1282, the poets, now known as the Cywyddwyr, continued to compose for the gentry, but the bard's sense of being indispensable to society faded with the political power of his patrons.

The bards formed a professional order with recognised rights, set out in the Laws of Hywel Dda, which name three classes of poet. Highest was the pencerdd ('chief of song'), the master-poet who headed the bardic community of a region, won his chair by competition, and had the right to train novices. He sang first in the royal hall, a song of God and then a song of kings, and received a harp from the king and held his land free. Below him the bardd teulu (household bard) was attached to a particular royal household.

Praise and elegy were the core of the bard's work, composed in strict and complex metres. A body of theoretical writing, the bardic grammars (Gramadegau'r Penceirddiaid), set out the craft and reserved praise for the prydydd, the true poet, while assigning satire to a lesser grade of entertainer, the clerwr. Welsh poems nonetheless imply a belief in the poet's power to harm a patron who treated him unjustly. The order declined and broke up in the late 16th and early 17th centuries.

A persistent Welsh tradition holds that Edward I, after the conquest of Wales in 1282, had the Welsh bards put to death for sedition, but no medieval source records the event and historian Prys Morgan treats it as a fable. The story first gained currency in the History of the Gwydir Family, written by Sir John Wynn early in the 17th century. It passed through Thomas Carte's A General History of England to the poet Thomas Gray, whose Pindaric ode "The Bard" (1757) fixed the legend in the public mind. From the 1770s the doomed bard became a favoured subject in painting, and the legend reached as far as Hungary in the ballad "A walesi bárdok" by János Arany, where Edward stands for a conqueror crushing a subject nation.

=== Ireland ===
Medieval Irish usually called the poet file (plural filid) and kept bard (plural baird) for a lower grade. The distinction was one of learning. The filid passed through a long training and commanded a wide range of skills, whereas the baird were held to rely on innate talent without a formal scholarly education, and their work was confined for the most part to panegyric and lyric verse.

By the 8th century the law-tracts, among them Uraicecht na Ríar, Uraicecht Becc, and Bretha Nemed, set out seven grades for the filid, modelled on the seven grades of the Church and ranked from the ollam at the top down through the ánruth, clí, cano, dos, and macfhuirmid to the fochloc. Each grade carried its own honour-price and a defined body of learning, the ollam being required to master some 350 tales along with the historical and legal sciences.

The professional poets belonged to hereditary learned families, the aos ealadhan, who trained in the bardic schools and shared a fixed literary language, Classical Irish, used for formal verse from about 1200 to about 1600 in both Ireland and Gaelic-speaking Scotland. Their eulogies and elegies for the reigning chieftains were composed in regulated syllabic metres, the dán díreach, and the poet's satire was widely feared. Early Irish sources describe the blisters of shame that public ridicule was thought to raise on its victim's face, the Old Irish word for 'face', enech, being also the word for 'honour'. As an institution Irish bardic poetry lasted into the 17th century, longer than its Welsh counterpart, until it fell with the Gaelic order it served.

=== Scotland ===
Gaelic Scotland shared the learned tradition of Ireland, and its classical verse was the work of the same kind of hereditary family. The most prominent was the MacMhuirich line (Clann MacMhuirich), which traced its descent from the Irish poet Muireadhach Albanach Ó Dálaigh (fl. 1200–1230) and kept its place in Gaelic learning, and above all in Classical Gaelic poetry, from his day down to the 18th century. Its members served the Lords of the Isles as court poets, and at times as lawyers and physicians.

After the fall of the Lordship in the late 15th century the family's patronage passed to the chiefs of Clanranald, for whom a MacMhuirich also served as seanchaidh, keeping the clan's genealogy and history. The last of the line to practice classical Gaelic poetry, Domhnall MacMhuirich, lived as a tenant on Clanranald land in South Uist in the 18th century. The classical order thus outlasted its Irish counterpart, surviving in Scotland into the early 18th century.

Distinct from this learned poetry was the bàrd baile (village poet), a local figure who composed verse in traditional form for his own community and recited it in the ceilidh house (taigh-cèilidh). Such poetry was oral and for the most part ephemeral, and the work of these poets began to reach print only at the end of the 19th century.

== Indo-European inheritance ==
The bard's task of conferring lasting fame on dead warriors places him within a wider Indo-European conception of the poet as the giver of fame (*ḱléwos). Martin L. West reads the notices of Ammianus and Lucan, that the bards sang the brave deeds of fallen men in heroic verse, alongside comparable practices among Germanic, Gothic, and Thracian peoples, and connects them to the inherited Indo-European theme illustrated by the Homeric kléa andrôn, the 'renowns of men'. In an oral society, a warrior's renown lasted only as long as the songs that carried it, so that his fame and the poet's became bound together. Calvert Watkins reconstructs the phrase for the imperishable fame that poetry secured, taking the Homeric kléos áphthiton and the Vedic śrávas ákṣitam ('imperishable fame') as reflexes of a single inherited formula. The same outlook surfaces in the Welsh Gododdin, where a fallen man is promised praise for as long as poets survive to sing of him.

The poet who could grant fame could also destroy it. Diodorus reports that the Gaulish bards praised some men and reviled others, and West notes that the power to praise and to denounce regularly go together in the early Indo-European traditions. A hostile song was held to carry real and dangerous force, Irish stories telling of poets whose satire raised blisters on a king's face or left his land barren. Some have regarded this double potency, the bard as both panegyrist and satirist, as an inherited feature of the Indo-European poet, though the inference has been questioned.

The poet's standing in medieval Ireland and ancient India has supplied the fullest material for reconstruction. In both, poetry was a hereditary profession passing from father to son, and it called for long training: Caesar reports that a Druidic education could run to twenty years, while the Irish fíli trained for seven. Poet and patron stood in a close relationship. The highest grade of fíli, the ollam, ranked in law with a king. Indian and Celtic poets alike were rewarded for praise with horses and cattle, while a patron who gave too little could find himself held up to ridicule instead.

The Indo-European poet thought of his composition as a thing made, and cast himself as a craftsman. The Welsh bards called themselves seiri gwawd ('carpenters of song'), claiming the tools and terms of the worker in wood and telling a rival who borrowed their themes to take his axe to the forest and cut his own timber. The image rests on an inherited metaphor. Watkins traces an expression for the fashioning of words, built on the root *teḱs- ('to fashion'), across the language family, including Vedic vácāṃsi ... takṣam ('I have fashioned these words'), along with Pindar's image of poets joining verses like carpenters. The root was lost in Celtic, but the conception survived, taking a weaving turn in the Old Irish faig ferb ('he wove words'). The Celtic word *natu- ('poem, song, incantation'), which produced Gaulish natia, Old Irish nath, and Middle Welsh nad, derives from PIE verb (s)neh_{1}-, meaning 'to sew'. According to Ranko Matasović, the semantic development could be explained in terms of poetic metaphors, whereby a poem is identified with a thread.

== Romantic and modern reception ==
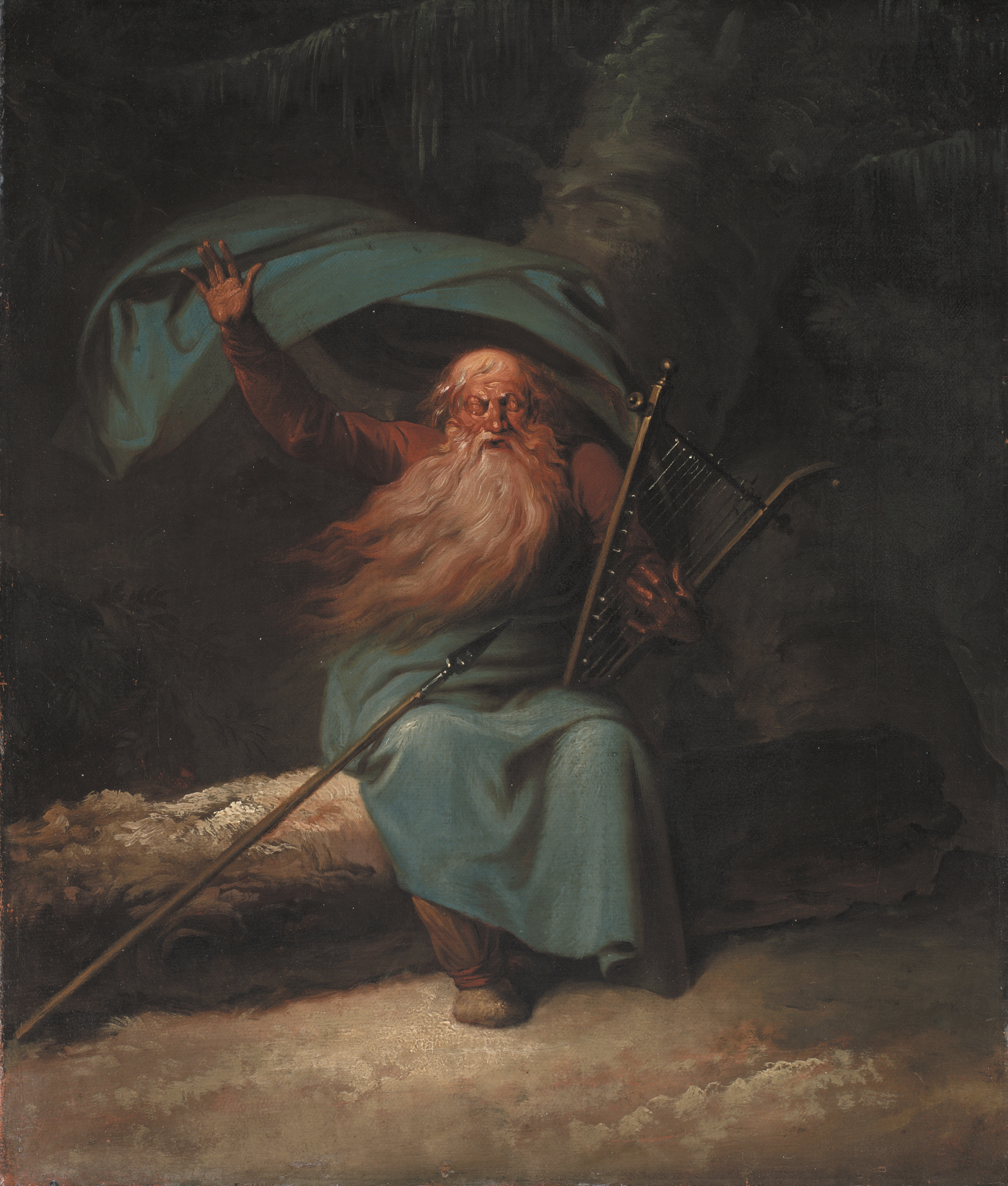
Ossian Singing, Nicolai Abildgaard, 1787

Because his task was to outlive the warriors and patrons whose deeds he commemorated, the bard appears in the native Celtic literatures as a melancholy survivor, a figure of age and loss whose verse takes on an elegiac and nostalgic tone. The poetry ascribed to Aneirin, Taliesin, Myrddin, and Oisín had shaped this home-grown image of the poet well before the 18th century. When the antiquarian and literary interests of later Georgian Britain turned to the Celtic past, they found in the bard a ready intermediary with a heroic age. The figure, set beside the druid, became a vehicle for the period's idea of the Celtic nations.

Several works carried the image to a wide audience. Thomas Gray's ode "The Bard", published in 1757, was an early treatment of the theme in English. The word itself entered general currency above all through the Works of Ossian, the supposed verse of an ancient Highland bard published by James Macpherson in the 1760s, which was read across Europe and admired by Herder and the young Goethe. In Wales, Edward Williams, writing under the bardic name Iolo Morganwg, set out to prove an unbroken descent from the ancient bards and druids to the Welsh poetry of his own day, a case he supported with literary forgeries that were exposed only after his death. In 1792 he founded the Gorsedd Beirdd Ynys Prydein ('Assembly of the Bards of the Island of Britain'), which was afterwards joined to the Eisteddfod and survives in altered form today.

From these strands a composite figure took shape, one that passed from Myrddin and Oisín into the Merlin and Ossian of English literature and European art. This bard was aged and wise, endowed with visionary or mantic power, a solitary who bore the sorrow of those who had died before him. The living traditions absorbed the external picture in turn, from the revival of chiefly poets in the Scottish Highlands to the eisteddfod of Wales. The figure was treated with sympathy by writers such as Scott and Peacock, but its standing fell in the Victorian period, and the unmasking of the Celtic forgeries cost it further credit. Its visionary and druidic traits nonetheless proved durable and remain familiar in popular culture, in modern fantasy writing and film. The word bard had meanwhile been extended, inaccurately, to the poets and singers of the Germanic world, and it now serves loosely for poets in general.

== See also ==
- Minstrel
- Troubadour
