= Ovate =

Ovate may refer to:

- Ovate (egg-shaped) leaves, tepals, or other botanical parts
- Ovate, a type of prehistoric stone hand axe
- Ovates, one of three ranks of membership in the Welsh Gorsedd
- Vates or ovate, a term for ancient Celtic bards, prophets, and philosophers
