= Madonna of the Rose (Parmigianino) =

Painting by Parmigianino

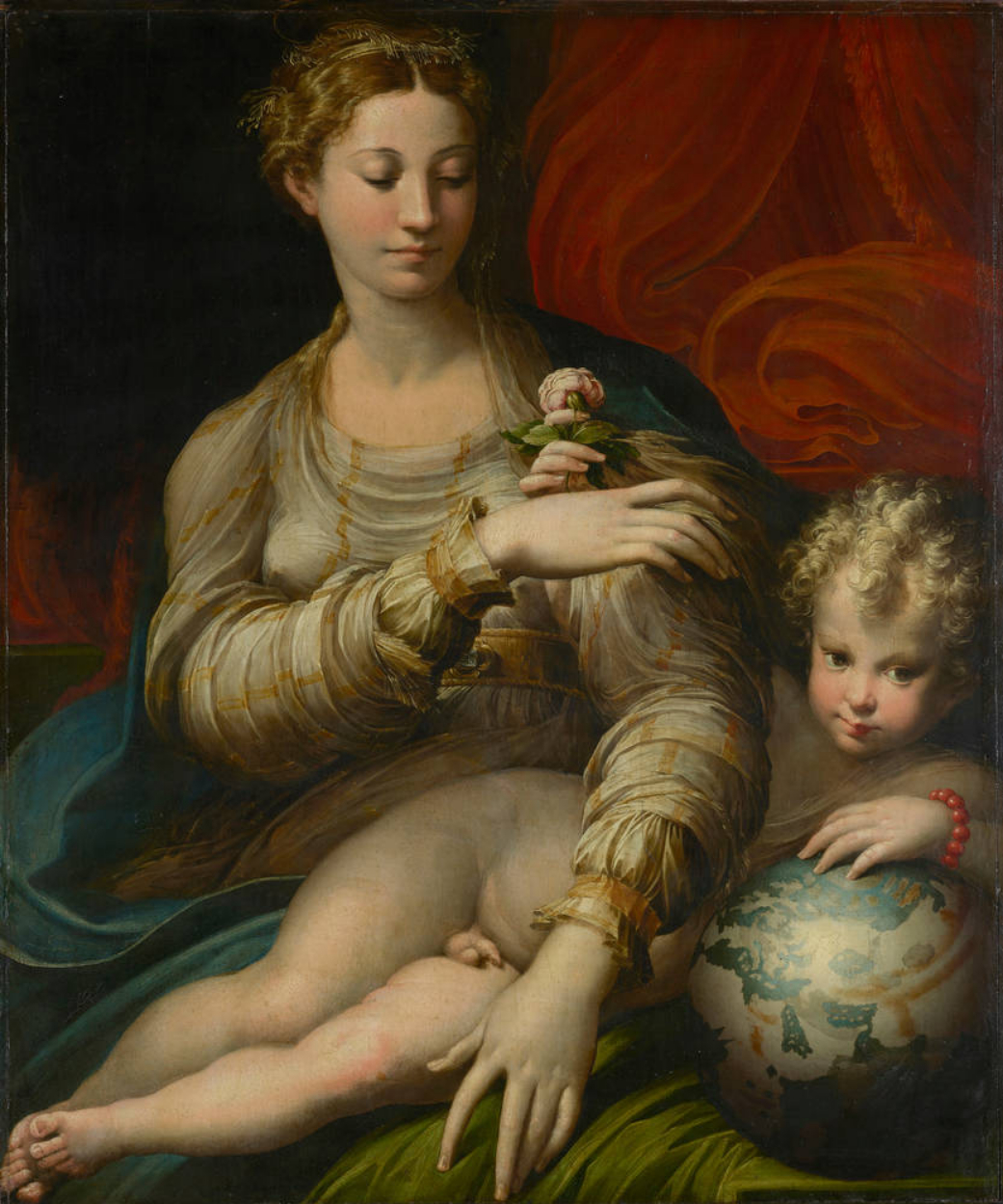
Madonna of the Rose (1530) by Parmigianino

Madonna of the Rose is a 1530 oil on panel painting by Parmigianino, now in the Gemäldegalerie in Dresden.

== History ==
It was originally painted for Pietro Aretino, but during pope Clement VII's spell in Bologna from December 1529 to April 1530 for Charles V's coronation it was instead given to the pope. The work is generally thought to have been completed by March 1530, when Parmigianino went to Venice with senator Ludovico Carbonesi to buy pigments for a later work, the unfinished frescoes for the San Maurizio chapel at San Petronio back in Bologna, personally commissioned by Charles V himself. Preparatory studies now in the Devonshire Collection at Chatsworth House show a kicking Christ-child.

However, with Parmigianino's departure from Bologna, the painting actually remained with father and son Dionigi and Bartolomeo Zani - Pietro Lamo recorded seeing it in Bartolomeo's house in 1560, describing it as "the Madonna with a baby in her arms with his fingers on a globe". In 1566 it was in Villa Zani in the hills around Bologna, where Doni saw it and a collection of antiquities.

It was first given its present title by Cavazzoni and already had a notoriously high price by then - Doni wrote that "[not even] a large cup of scudi would pay for it". The Zani family refused several buyers such as Vincenzo I Gonzaga (2 February 1585) and cardinal Farnese, who offered 40 scudi for it. Fifty copies from it had already been made by Vasari's time, all commissioned by its owners whilst jealously guarding the original - one of them is now in the Royal Collection. It was only in 1752 that count Paolo Zani sold the original work to Augustus III of Saxony for 1,350 zecchini, bringing it to its present home.
