= Pietro di Giovanni Tedesco =

Flemish sculptor

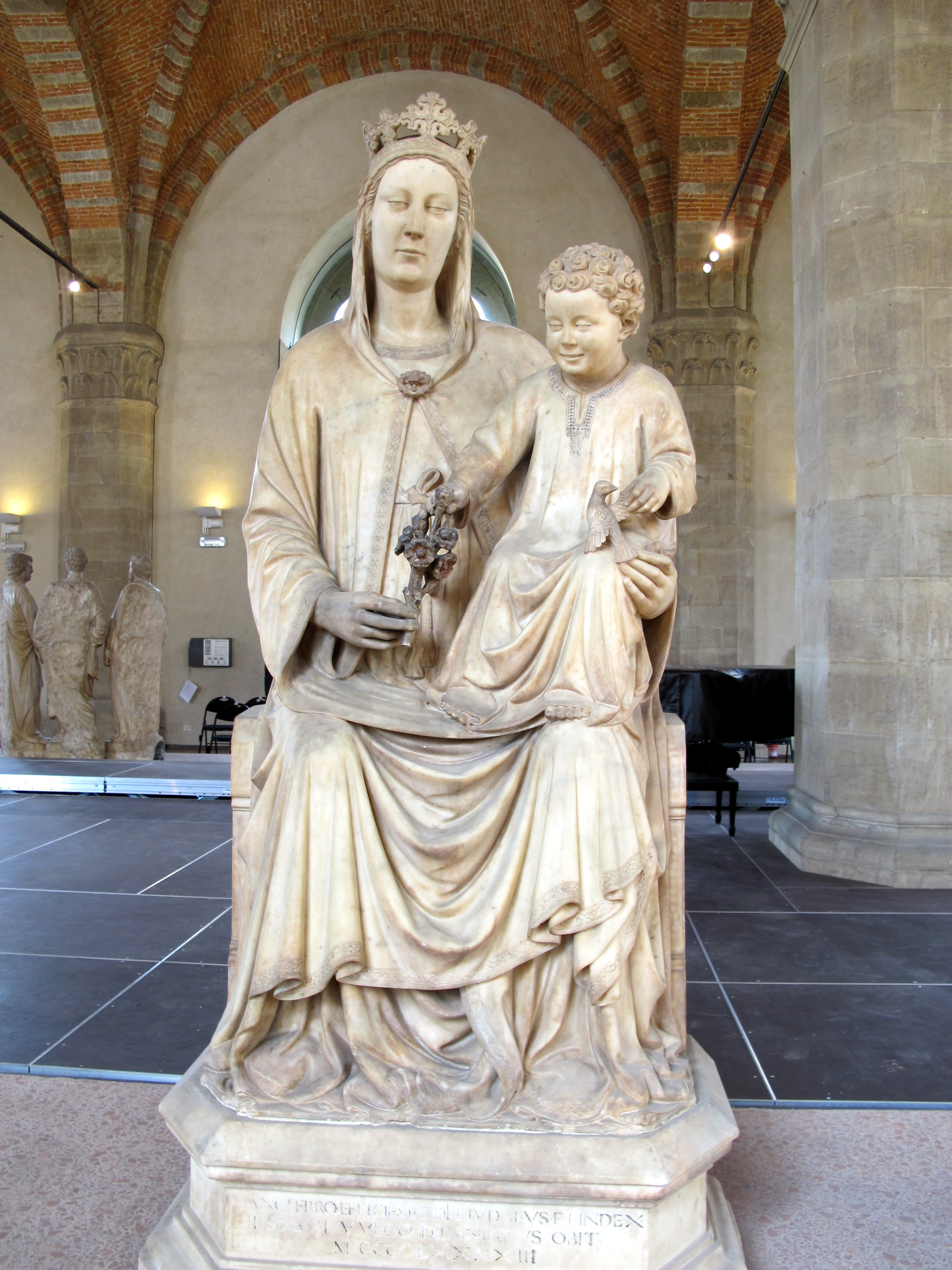
Madonna della Rosa from Orsanmichele

Piero di Giovanni Tedesco (died c. 1402) was a German or Flemish sculptor active in Italy. He was born before 1386.

== Life ==
According to Lorenzo Ghiberti, he owed his nickname 'Tedesco' to his origins in Germany or (according to others) in the Duchy of Brabant. He is first recorded in Florence in 1386 - there he worked on Florence Cathedral up until 1399 and a document dated 5 September 1387 from its records shows a payment to the painter Lorenzo di Bicci for designing a sculpture for Piero Tedesco to carve. He also worked on Milan Cathedral and in 1402 he is recorded as working on the font in Orvieto Cathedral.

The c.1399 Madonna of the Rose is attributed to him. Niccolò di Piero Lamberti was his assistant. His son Niccolò was a master glassmaker who worked on the windows at Orsanmichele among other places.

== Known works ==
- Angel musicians (1386), Museo dell'Opera del Duomo (Firenze)
- Apostle (previously attributed to Andrea Pisano)
- Doctor of the Church, Museo dell'Opera del Duomo (Firenze)
- Saint Andrew and Saint Simon (1387),
- Saint Mark and Saint John (1388),
- Saint James (1389),
- Saint Thomas and Saint Bartholomew (c. 1390),
- Saint Stephen (1391), Museo dell'Opera del Duomo (Firenze)
- Saints Victor, Ambrose and Jerome
- Decoration of the right side door to Santa Maria del Fiore (1395 - 1398),
- Madonna della Rosa, Orsanmichele (c. 1399),
- Font, Orvieto Cathedral (1402).
