= Zecchini =

Zecchini is a surname. Notable people with the surname include:

- Alessia Zecchini (born 1992), Italian freediver
- Giuseppe Zecchini (born 1952), Italian historian
- Lino Zecchini (born 1928), Italian alpine skier
- Luciano Zecchini (born 1949), Italian footballer and coach
