= Saint George (Donatello) =

Marble sculpture, c. 1417

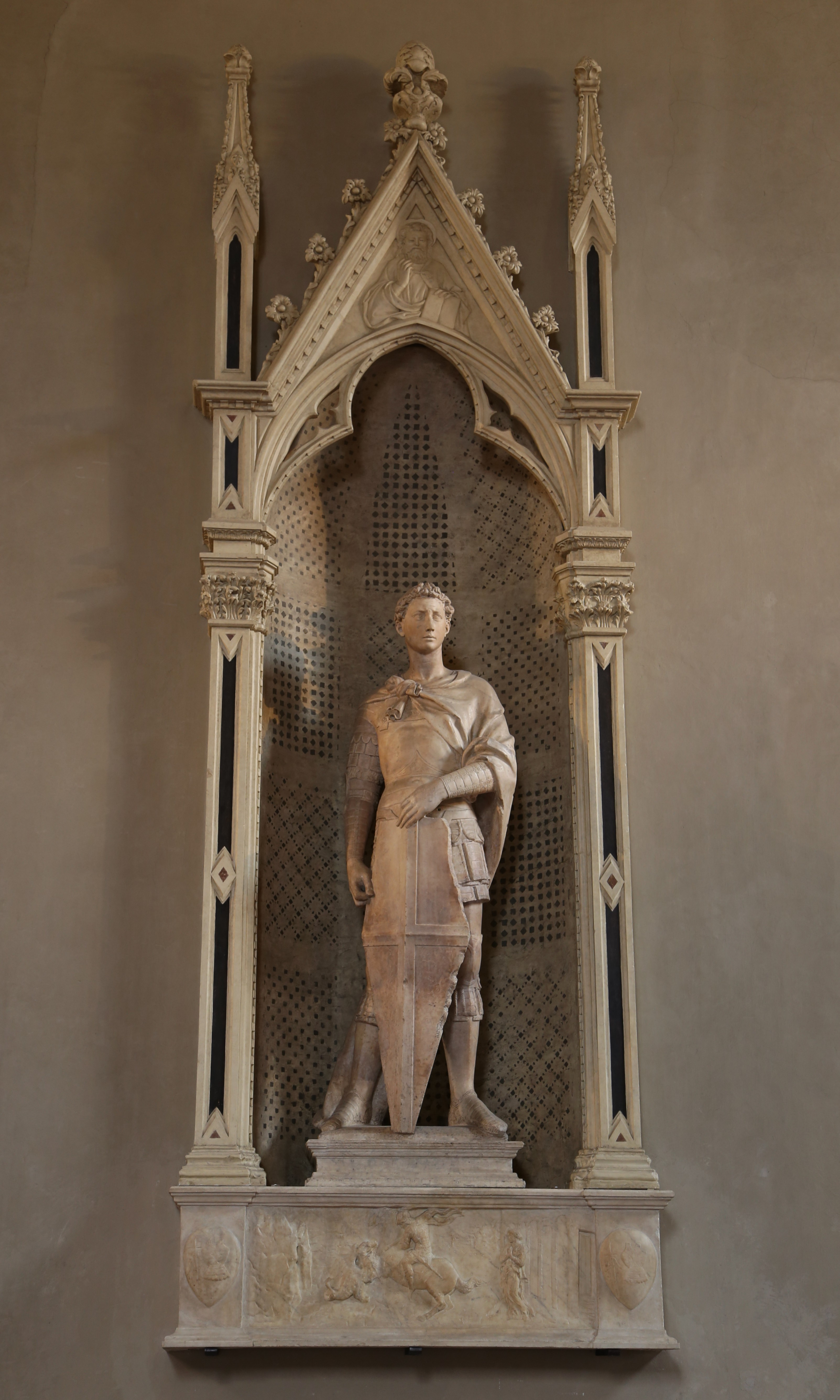
- Artist: Donatello
- Year: 1415–1417
- Location: Bargello Museum, Florence

Saint George (Italian: San Giorgio) is a marble sculpture by Donatello currently housed in the Bargello Museum in Florence, Italy. It is one of fourteen sculptures commissioned by the guilds of Florence to decorate the external niches of the Orsanmichele Church. As the patron of the guild of the armorers and sword makers, the Arte dei Corazzai e Spadai, St. George was commissioned as a knight in armour to promote and advertise their products.

== History ==
Scholars generally date the statue of St. George's completion to 1417 as there is evidence of a marble purchase for the statue's base dating to around 1416. While the statue was first stationed on the northern side of Orsanmichele Church, it was moved in 1700 to the niche occupied by the Madonna of the Rose on the southern side for better protection from the sun. A stone thrown at the sculpture in 1858 broke its nose, which was eventually replaced by Aristodemo Costoli. In 1860, a proposal was made to relocate the statue to the Galleria delle Statue of the Uffizi with a bronze replica to be put in its place, but this plan was not initially implemented. In 1868, the Tuscan government created a commission to find a long term solution for the protection of the statue. The statue was then moved to the Bargello Museum in Florence in 1892.

From 1892 to 2008, a bronze replica occupied the original niche; it was replaced with a marble replica on 23 April 2008. The original sculpture was stored at the Villa di Poggio a Caiano during the Second World War to protect it from bombing, but it was stolen by German soldiers; it was recovered by Frederick Hartt in Neumelans in the South Tyrol and returned to Florence in 1945. The box base was added back onto the statue in 1976.

== Description ==
Saint George is sculpted as a young, brave, determined and strong man in armor. He is not standing in contrapposto–his weight is distributed on both legs as he balances on the balls of his feet. Even though he is fully clothed, there is still the sense of a muscular body underneath. A primary challenge that Donatello faced in his creation of the statue was showcasing the bodily movements under the armor. To resolve this, he decided to allude to them through the statue's pose and expressed St. George's emotion in his face and the use of his hands. Scholars suspect that St. George's right hand once held a metal sword–a marble sword being difficult to carve.

Four drill marks appear on the figure's head: one in front of his left ear, one directly in the middle of his face just under his hairline, and two more found in his hair on either side of his head. These drill marks indicate that the figure most likely wore some kind of helmet. H.W. Janson observed that St. George is 15 to 20 cm shorter than other marble statues in the Orsanmichele Church, hypothesizing that the gap was meant to leave space for a helmet. Two other drill holes are also found on St. George's left thigh, which may mark attachment points for a sword sheath.

St. George's eyes are looking upward, but scholars have found differing meanings in his expression, some sensing anxiety and others seeing alertness. His eyebrows are knit together and there are wrinkles on his forehead.

== Relief ==
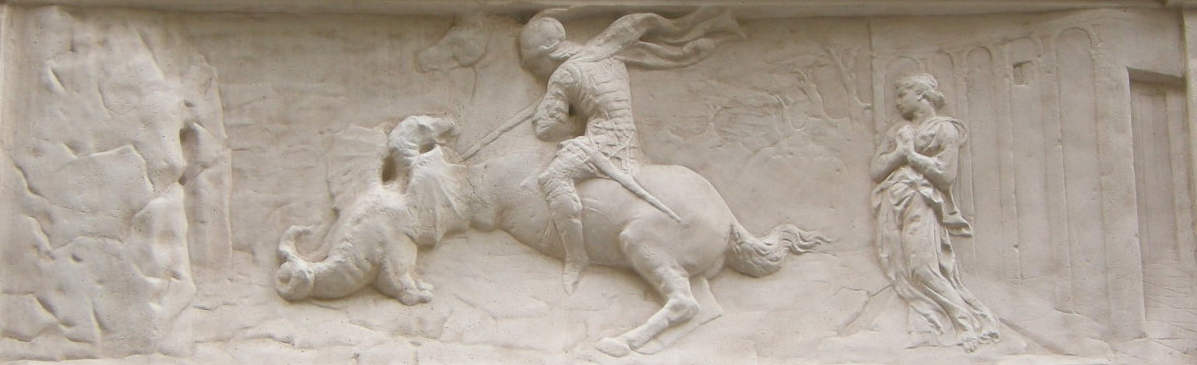
St George Freeing the Princess

Under the statue is a stone relief in which Donatello first used a method known as rilievo schiacciato, a form involving very shallow cuts into the surface. The scene depicts St. George slaying the dragon in the middle, a cave on the left, a colonnade on the right, and a background consisting of swaying trees and rolling hills. The closest objects are carved in relatively high relief, whereas the cave, the colonnade and the background trees and hills are carved in low relief. With the use of this relief method, weathering over time has created some difficulty in making out subtle carvings. Scholars believe that the military equipment found in the relief is copied from that of the physical statue, meaning that the relief was most likely created one to two years after.

The relief is only two centimeters deep and is often compared by scholars to the works of Nanni di Banco. Unlike Banco, Donatello did not use a neutral ground; his background conveys deeply receding space even though his chisel barely scratches the surface. The relief has been celebrated by scholars for the effect of prontezza (alertness or preparedness), which influenced later artists. The relief is also significant for taking the form of a predella, a feature uncommonly found in sculpture.
