= Madonna of the Rose (Orsanmichele) =

Sculpture attributed to Pietro di Giovanni Tedesco

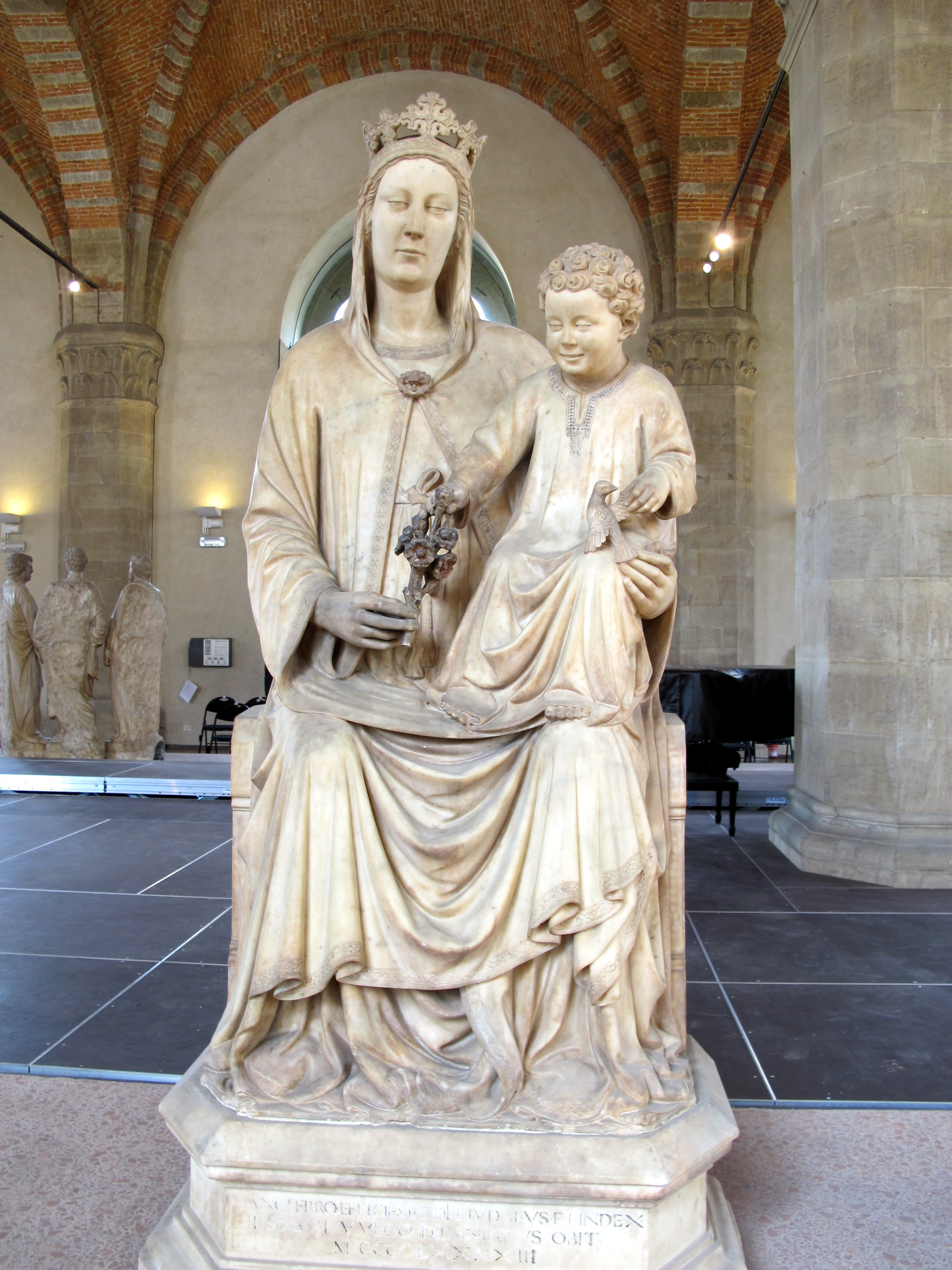
- Artist: Attributed to Pietro di Giovanni Tedesco
- Year: c. 1399
- Medium: marble sculpture
- Dimensions: 220 cm (87 in)
- Location: Museo di Orsanmichele, Florence

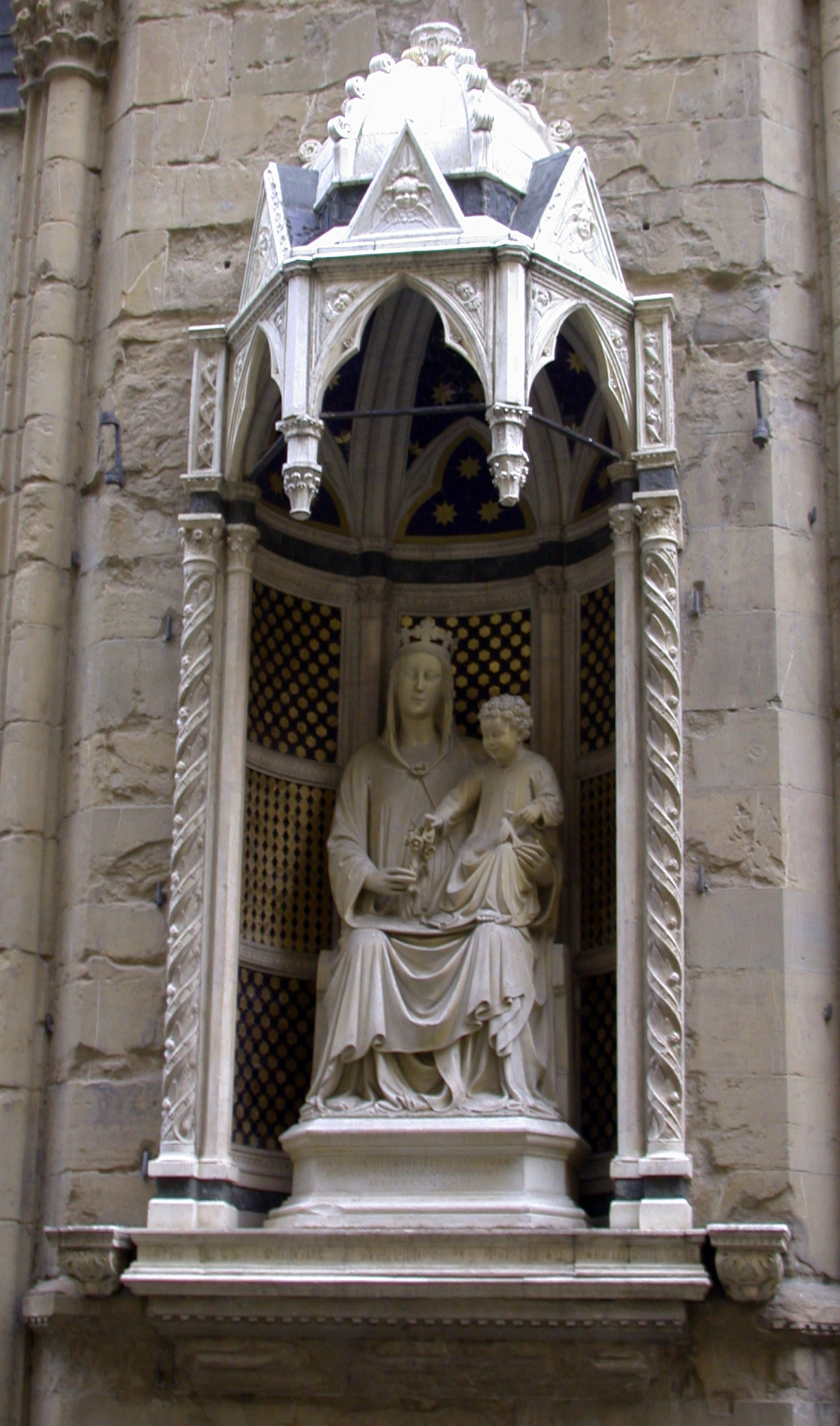
The replica of the Madonna of the Rose in the external niche.

The Madonna of the Rose (Italian: Madonna della Rosa) is a 2.2 metre high marble sculpture of the Madonna and Child enthroned, with the Child trying to take a bunch of rosa canina from his mother's hand. It forms part of a cycle of fourteen sculptures of the patron saints of the guilds of Florence on the external niches of the Orsanmichele church. No documents survive to precisely date it, leading to several theories and attributions. Most art historians attribute it to Pietro di Giovanni Tedesco, a German or Flemish sculptor active in Florence in the sculpture-yard of Florence Cathedral. It shows similarities to late works from the school of Giotto.

A Latin inscription on the base of the niche records damage to the sculpture in 1493 - Mary was the protector of Florence and the person who damaged the sculpture was sentenced to death. The Madonna was commissioned by the 'Arte dei Medici e Speziali' and completed around 1399. An object of great popular devotion, it was moved inside the church in 1628, meaning it is in a much better condition than the other thirteen sculptures in the cycle. It is now in the Museo di Orsanmichele, although a copy fills its original external niche, which had been used from 1858 until 1891 for Saint George by Donatello. It was restored in 1996, revealing it had possibly originally been painted.
