= Mariccus =

Mariccus (d. 69) was a Gallic Boian leader who lived in the mid 1st century AD and led a failed revolt against Roman rule.

According to Tacitus, in 68 AD the lowly born Mariccus declared himself a god and the champion of Gaul. He gathered an army of about 8.000 men, but his revolt was put down by the Aeduan tribal militia and some cohorts of Roman auxiliaries which were sent to aid them. Mariccus was captured and sentenced to death. In 69 AD in the attendance of Vitellius he was thrown to the wild animals in the arena but the beasts refused to attack him. Vitellius then ordered his execution “by more practical means”.
