= Madonna of the Roses =

c. 1530 painting by Titian

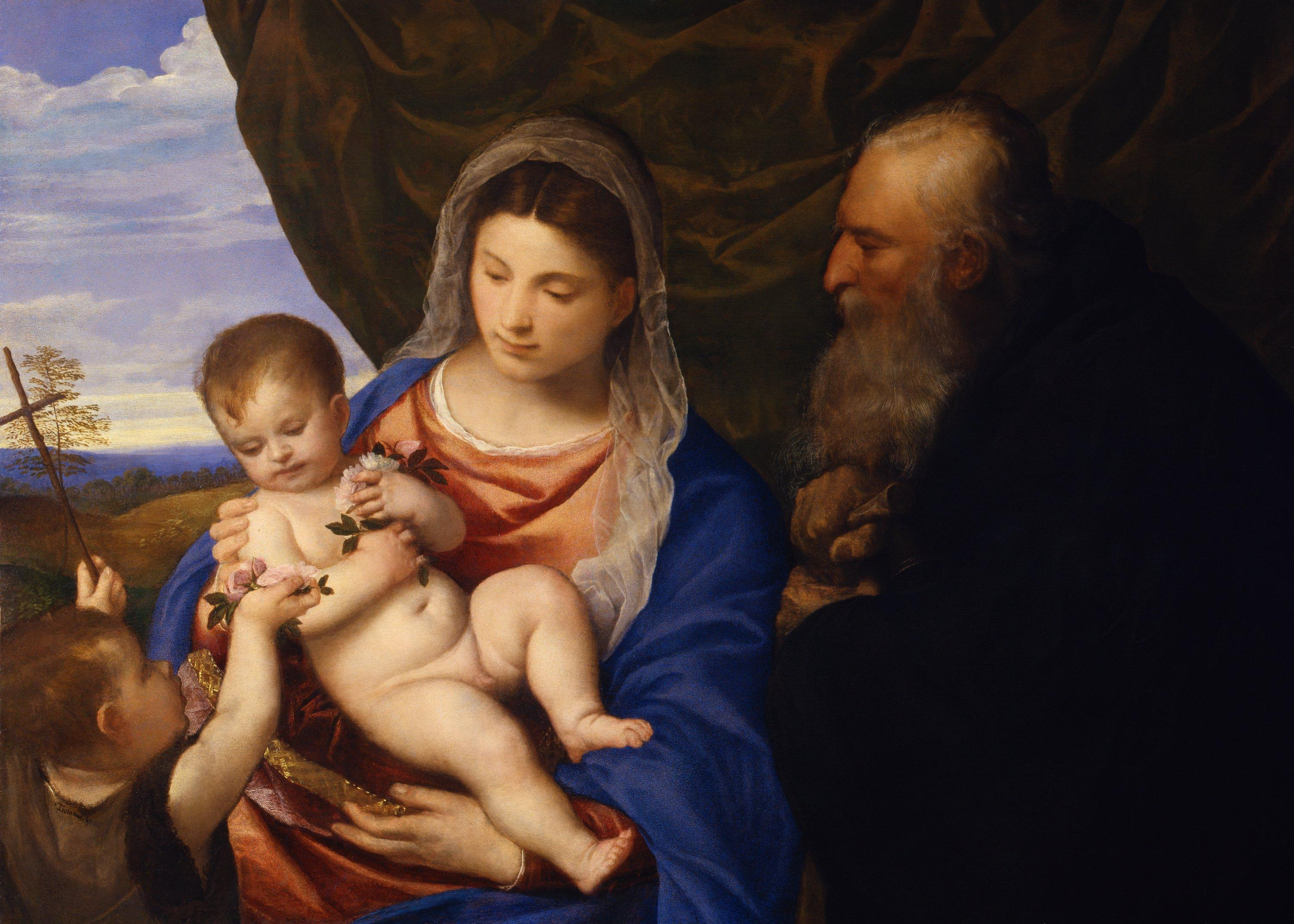
Madonna of the Roses (c. 1530) by Titian

Madonna of the Roses is an oil on panel painting by Titian, from c. 1530. It is now in the Uffizi, in Florence. As well as the Madonna and Child it also shows Anthony the Great and a young John the Baptist. It is signed "Ticianus f.", but this may be a later addition.

It formed part of the collection of Archduke Leopold Wilhelm of Austria. In 1793 it and several other works were exchanged between Vienna and Florence, also including Titian's Flora, Dürer's Adoration of the Magi and Giovanni Bellini's Holy Allegory.

== Bibliography ==
- Francesco Valcanover, L'opera completa di Tiziano, Milan, Rizzoli, 1969 (Italian).
