= Françoise Le Roux =

French historian of religions and Celticist (1927–2004)

- Born: 19 December 1927; Rennes, France
- Died: 23 December 2004 (aged 77); Rennes, France
- Spouse: Christian-Joseph Guyonvarc'h
- Awards: Prix Amic (Académie française), 1980

Academic background
- Education: École pratique des hautes études
- Influences: Georges Dumézil

Academic work
- Discipline: History of religions, Celtic studies
- Main interests: Celtic religion and mythology, comparative Indo-European religion
- Notable works: Les Druides (1961)

Françoise Le Roux (19 December 1927 – 23 December 2004) was a French historian of religions and Celticist. A pupil of Georges Dumézil, she specialised in the religion and mythology of the ancient Celts, which she interpreted within comparative Indo-European religion. She co-founded the Rennes journal Ogam, and with her husband Christian-Joseph Guyonvarc'h produced a large body of work on Celtic civilisation over some fifty years. Their revised edition of Les Druides received the Académie française's Prix Amic in 1980.

== Life ==
Le Roux was born at Rennes on 19 December 1927, the daughter of the linguist Pierre Le Roux. She was drawn early to Breton and Celtic subjects and took a diploma at the École pratique des hautes études, where she was a pupil of Georges Dumézil. She became a specialist in the history of the Indo-European religions. In 1948 she was a co-founder of the journal Ogam, later Ogam-Tradition celtique.

She married the philologist and linguist Christian-Joseph Guyonvarc'h, a specialist in the medieval Irish texts and the Celtic languages, and the two worked together for some fifty years. Le Roux published about twenty books, alone or with Guyonvarc'h, and close to three hundred articles in specialist journals. The couple edited Ogam at Rennes and later at Cesson-Sévigné, and developed it into a publishing house. She died at Rennes on 23 December 2004.

== Work ==
Le Roux's first book, Les Druides, appeared in 1961 in the Presses Universitaires de France series 'Mythes et religions'. A greatly enlarged edition, written with Guyonvarc'h, was published by Ogam-Celticum in 1978, and a further edition brought out by Éditions Ouest-France in 1986 was reprinted many times and translated into several European languages. Their other joint books include La Celtique, La Civilisation celtique, La Société celtique, Les Fêtes celtiques and La Souveraineté guerrière de l'Irlande: Mórrígan, Bodb, Macha.

Following Dumézil, Le Roux and Guyonvarc'h interpreted the Celtic evidence within comparative Indo-European religion and applied to it his trifunctional analysis. Reviewing several of their books in Études irlandaises in 1981, Pierre Joannon commended the scale of the undertaking and the way it made accessible a mass of texts known only to specialists.

== Recognition ==
In 1980 the revised Les Druides brought Le Roux and Guyonvarc'h the Prix Amic of the Académie française.

== Selected publications ==
- Les Druides. Paris: Presses Universitaires de France, 1961. Revised and enlarged edition, with Christian-J. Guyonvarc'h, Rennes: Ogam-Celticum, 1978. Further edition, Rennes: Éditions Ouest-France, 1986. ISBN 2-85882-920-9.
- Introduction générale à l'étude de la tradition celtique, I. Rennes: Ogam-Tradition celtique, 1967.
- with Christian-J. Guyonvarc'h, La Celtique. Rennes: Ogam-Celticum, 1979.
- with Christian-J. Guyonvarc'h, La Souveraineté guerrière de l'Irlande: Mórrígan, Bodb, Macha. Rennes: Ogam-Celticum, 1983.
- with Christian-J. Guyonvarc'h, La Civilisation celtique. Rennes: Ogam-Tradition celtique, 1986. New edition, Éditions Ouest-France, 1990. Paris: Payot, 2001.
- with Christian-J. Guyonvarc'h, La Société celtique: dans l'idéologie trifonctionnelle et la tradition religieuse indo-européennes. Rennes: Éditions Ouest-France, 1991. ISBN 2-7373-0902-6.
- with Christian-J. Guyonvarc'h, Les Fêtes celtiques. Rennes: Éditions Ouest-France, 1995.
- with Christian-J. Guyonvarc'h, La Légende de la ville d'Is. Rennes: Éditions Ouest-France, 2000. ISBN 2-7373-1413-5.

She also contributed to the Dictionnaire des symboles, edited by Jean Chevalier and Alain Gheerbrant (1969).
