= Christian-Joseph Guyonvarc'h =

French philologist and Celticist (1926–2012)

- Born: 18 October 1926; Auray, Brittany
- Died: 9 January 2012 (aged 85); Guilers, Brittany
- Citizenship: French
- Occupations: Philologist, linguist
- Spouse: Françoise Le Roux

Academic work
- Discipline: Celtic studies
- Institutions: Rennes 2 University
- Notable works: Les Druides (1986)

Christian-Joseph Guyonvarc'h (18 October 1926, Auray – 9 January 2012, Guilers) was a French philologist and linguist who specialised in Celtic studies.

== Biography ==
Christian-Joseph Guyonvarc'h was born on 18 October 1926 in Auray, Brittany (France), and grew up in a French-Breton bilingual environment. Along with his wife, Françoise Le Roux (1927–2004), he wrote numerous works on Celtic studies, including Les Druides ('The Druids', 1986), La Civilisation celtique ('Celtic Civilisation', 1990), La Société celtique ('Celtic Society', 1991) and Les Fêtes celtiques ('Celtic Festivals', 1995). With Le Roux he edited the Rennes journal Ogam, later Ogam-Tradition celtique, which the couple developed into a publishing house. Georges Dumézil directed Le Roux's first studies and was president of the jury at Guyonvarc'h's doctorate thesis in 1980. In 1980 their revised Les Druides received the Prix Amic of the Académie française.

Guyonvarc'h taught Old Irish and Breton at Rennes 2 University. He died on 9 January 2012 in Guilers.

Guyonvarc'h could speak Breton, Welsh, and Irish (in their modern and historical stages), as well as modern French, German, Dutch, and English. From 1979 to 1981, he was a member of the patronage committee of Nouvelle École, the annual magazine of the ethno-nationalist think tank GRECE.

== Works ==
- Dictionnaire étymologique du breton ancien, moyen et moderne. Rennes, 1973.
- Le Catholicon, reprint of the Jehan Calvez edition owned by the city of Rennes (5 November 1499). Éditions Ogam, Rennes, 1975. Reprinted by éditions Armeline, Brest, 2005.
- Textes mythologiques irlandais. Rennes, Ogam-Celticum, no. 11/1 & 2, 1978.
- with Françoise Le Roux, Morrigan-Bodb-Macha: la souveraineté guerrière de l'Irlande. 1983.
- Aux origines du breton: le glossaire vannetais du Chevalier Arnold von Harff, voyageur allemand du XVe siècle. Ogam-Celticum, 1984. ISBN 2902761031.
- with Françoise Le Roux, Les Druides. Ouest-France Université, coll. « De mémoire d'homme : l'histoire », Rennes, 1986. ISBN 2-85882-920-9.
- with Françoise Le Roux, La Civilisation celtique. Ouest-France Université, series De mémoire d'homme : l'histoire, Rennes, 1990. ISBN 2-7373-0297-8.
- with Françoise Le Roux, La Société celtique. Ouest-France Université, series De mémoire d'homme : l'histoire, Rennes, 1991. ISBN 2-7373-0902-6.
- La razzia des vaches de Cooley (translation of the Táin Bó Cúailnge). Éditions Gallimard, 1994. ISBN 2070738981.
- with Françoise Le Roux, Les Fêtes celtiques. Ouest-France Université, series De mémoire d'homme : l'histoire, Rennes, 1995. ISBN 978-2-7373-1198-7.
- Magie, médecine et divination chez les Celtes. Bibliothèque scientifique Payot, Paris, 1997. ISBN 2-228-89112-6.
- Le Dialogue des deux Sages. Bibliothèque scientifique Payot, Paris, 1999. ISBN 2-228-89214-9.
- with Françoise Le Roux, La légende de la ville d'Is. Ouest-France Université, series De mémoire d'homme : l'histoire, Rennes, 2000. ISBN 2-7373-1413-5.
- Les Royaumes celtiques. 2001. French translation of Myles Dillon and Nora K. Chadwick, The Celtic Realms, with an added chapter by Guyonvarc'h.
- Le Sacrifice dans la tradition celtique. Éditions Armeline, Brest, 2005. ISBN 2-910878-31-7.
