= Giuseppe Zecchini =

Italian historian (born 1952)

Giuseppe Zecchini (born 1952 in Milan) is an Italian historian.

He is mainly concerned with the political history of the Roman world in the age of Caesar and Augustus and in the late antiquity and with the history of Hellenistic and Roman historiography.

Born in Milan in 1952, he graduated in 1975 at the Faculty of Letters of the Università Cattolica del Sacro Cuore in Milan as a pupil of Marta Sordi. He has been teaching history of ancient historiography at the Università Cattolica from 1979 and Roman history at Chieti´s University from 1994 to 1997. He is currently full professor of Roman history at the Università Cattolica. He has been visiting professor in Dresden in 2001 and in Paris-Sorbonne in 2002.

He is member of the Italian Institute of Ancient History’s board from 2004, member of the Istituto Lombardo, member of the Canussio Foundation’s scientific committee, member of the scientific committee of the journals “Aevum” and “De rebus antiquis”, co director of the journal “Politica Antica”, director of the series CERDAC at the 'L’Erma di Bretschneider'.

== Bibliography ==
- Cassio Dione e la guerra gallica di Cesare, Vita e Pensiero, Milano 1978

- Aezio: l'ultima difesa dell'Occidente romano, L’Erma di Bretschneider, Roma 1983

- I druidi e l'opposizione dei Celti a Roma, Jaca Book, Milano 1984

- Il Carmen de bello Actiaco: storiografia e lotta politica in età augustea, Steiner, Stuttgart 1987

- La cultura storica di Ateneo, Vita e Pensiero, Milano 1989

- Ricerche di storiografia Latina tardoantica, I-II, L’Erma di Bretschneider, Roma 1993-2011

- Il pensiero politico romano. Dal periodo arcaico a Giustiniano, Carocci, Roma 1997 = V reprint, 2012

- Cesare e il mos maiorum, Steiner, Stuttgart 2001

- Vercingetorige, Laterza, Roma-Bari 2002

- Los druidas y la oposición de los Celtas a Roma, Alderabán, Madrid 2002

- Attila, Sellerio, Palermo 2007

- Le guerre galliche di Roma, Carocci, Roma 2009
