= Timagenes =

Ancient Greek writer

Timagenes (Ancient Greek: Τιμαγένης) was a Greek writer, historian and teacher of rhetoric, son of a royal banker. Suda writes that some say that he was Egyptian. He came from Alexandria, was captured by Romans in 55 BC and taken to Rome, where he was purchased by Faustus Cornelius Sulla, son of Sulla. It is said that Timagenes had a falling-out with emperor Augustus, whereupon he destroyed his writings and fled Rome. He also asked Cleopatra to deliver Mark Antony to Octavianus, or have him put to death.

During his life Timagenes wrote a Universal History (until the time of Caesar) and a History of the Gauls. These works did not survive but are known through quotations in other historians. For example, the History of the Gauls is quoted in the works of Ammianus Marcellinus. It is sometimes credited as the source for Pompeius Trogus's Philippic Histories, which survive in Justin's epitome.

Timagenes' death has all the hallmarks of poisoning; it is stated in the Suda that he was at a villa in the Roman region of Albania or 'Albanum' and felt sick shortly after dinner. He attempted to vomit, but choked and died as a result.
