= Votive Column of Lisieux =

Roman-period column

Votive column in Lisieux
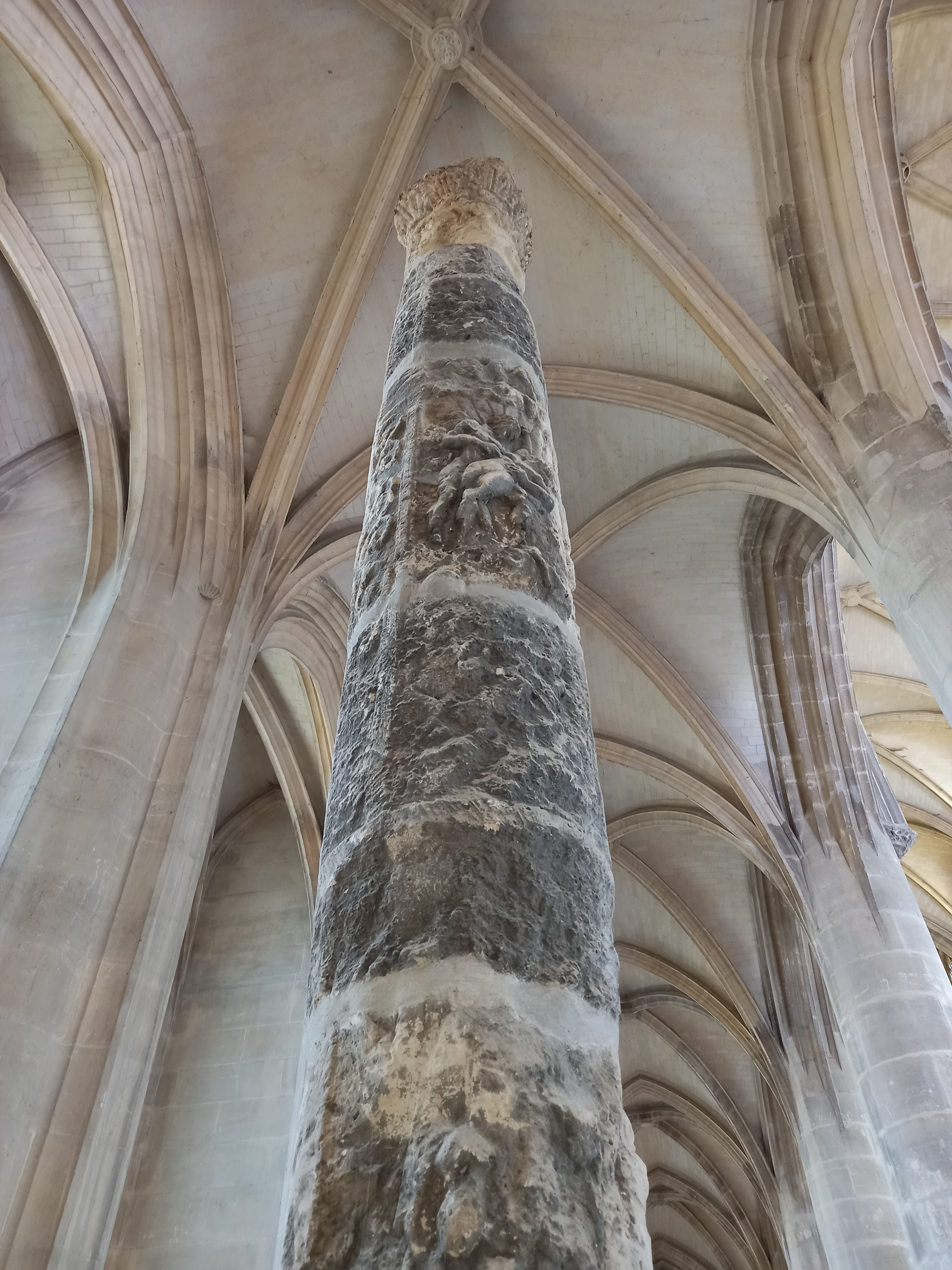
- View of the column
- Type: Column
- Material: Limestone
- Period/culture: 2nd or 3rd century
- Discovered: 1947
- Culture: Ancient Rome

The Votive Column of Lisieux is a Roman-period column discovered during reconstruction works in the city of Lisieux, France, in an area that had been destroyed during the Battle of Normandy. It is located in the city center.

The surviving fragments of the column feature both inscriptions and figurative reliefs, which constitute its main distinctive characteristic. The circumstances of its discovery, the fragmentary state of preservation, and the reconstruction choices have raised issues of identification and interpretation. Its classification as a votive column remains debated, as this type of monument appears in different contexts and cannot be assigned with certainty to a single category.

The monument is regarded as being of considerable interest by the historian Elisabeth Deniaux. It constitutes the only known preserved representation of a religious scene from ancient Rome within the territory of present-day Normandy. After being reassembled in a public square near the site of the current municipal media library, the monument has been preserved since the late 1980s in the deconsecrated Church of Saint-Jacques.

== History ==
=== Antiquity ===
==== General overview: Lisieux in Antiquity ====
Location of the Lexovii territory during the High Roman Empire.

The Gallic people known as the Lexovii are mentioned by Julius Caesar in connection with the massacre of senators in 56 BC at their principal stronghold, possibly identified with the oppidum of Castellier, located approximately 3 km southwest of the present city. Their administrative, civil, and military organization remains poorly documented, though they appear to have been governed by a local oligarchy. The Lexovii were allied with the Veneti and the Unelli. The settlement fulfilled an economic role, as reflected in its ancient name, Noviomagus (“new market”), and its location along a commercial route.

Map of ancient Lisieux and location of known ruins: the column site is at no. 6.

The ancient city was laid out on an orthogonal plan adapted to the local terrain, structured around a north–south axis (the cardo maximus) and an east–west axis (the decumanus maximus), the latter measuring approximately 12.4 m in width. The city reached its peak during the second half of the 2nd century. It possessed a river port on the Touques and was also bordered by the Orbiquet. (Note: Lantier 1959, p. 338) A large sanctuary, covering an estimated 50 to 60 hectares, was located at Vieux-Lisieux, within the present-day municipality of Saint-Désir.

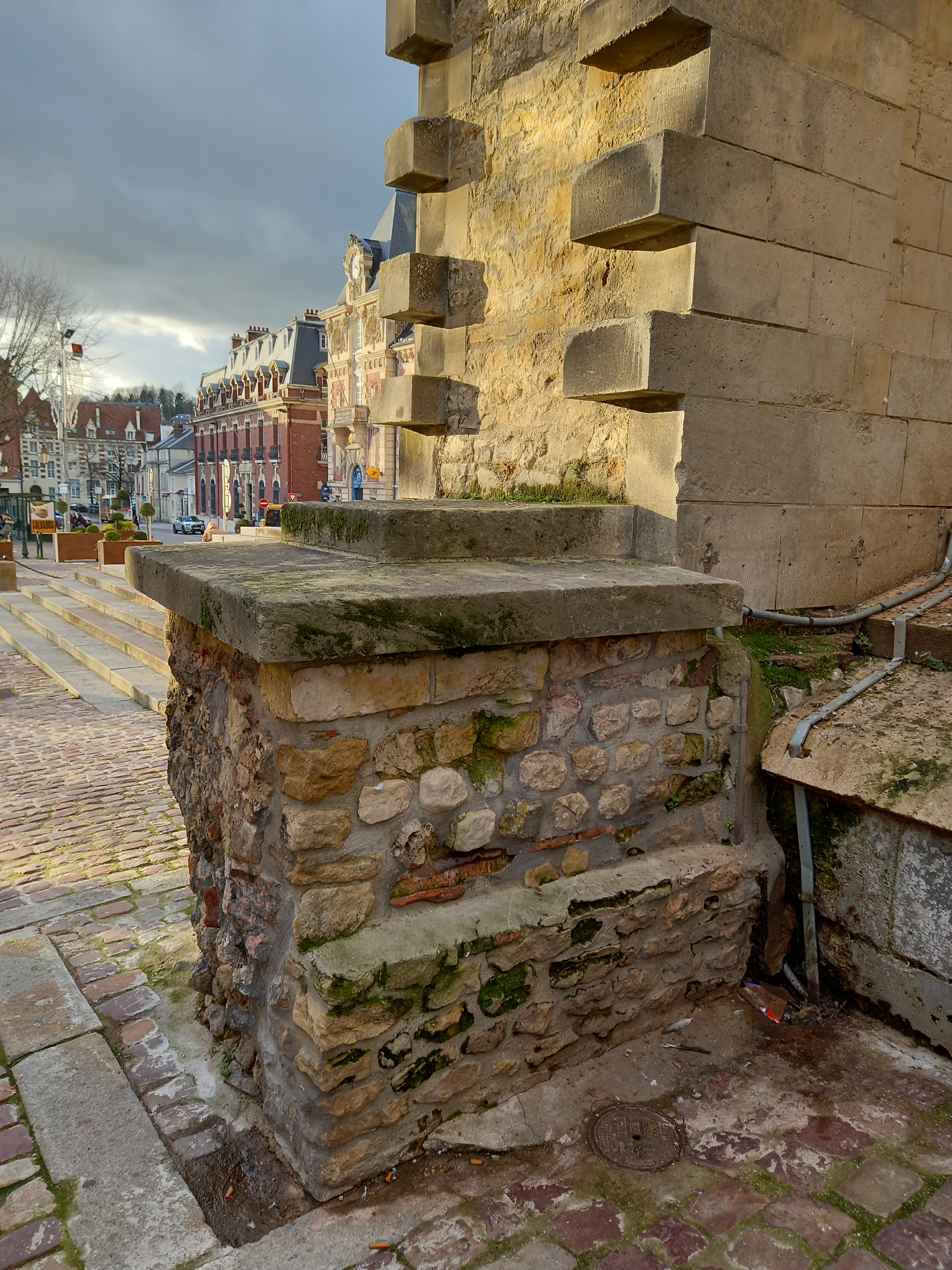
Fragment of the wall of the Late Roman Empire.

The layout of the ancient city center remains poorly documented, although researchers consider the areas of the present-day cathedral and the current media library site to have been of particular importance. Excavations conducted prior to the construction of the media library revealed a gallery over 30 m long, possibly part of a forum rebuilt in the mid-2nd century. Nineteenth-century investigations also suggested the presence of a structure with an upper gallery extending up to 100 m. Some urban buildings appear to have been of notable architectural and artistic quality.

During the 3rd century, the city was affected by Frankish and Saxon raids, during which several structures were damaged by fire. Economic activity declined, and the settlement contracted around a fortified enclosure (castrum) measuring approximately 400 m by 200 m. The construction of this fortification required substantial quantities of building material, much of which was obtained by dismantling earlier structures. Three gates were incorporated into the defensive walls.

==== Discovery area and dating of the remains ====
Nearby excavations uncovered a Gallo-Roman building as well as a monumental structure constructed in medium ashlar masonry. The site is considered a prominent location within the urban fabric, positioned between the lower, more economically active area of the city and its monumental sector. The remains were discovered in situ, close to the decumanus and the Orbiquet River.

The location of the column overlooks the former course of the Orbiquet.

Although the excavator initially proposed that the monument was a votive column, it may instead have formed part of a larger architectural complex, such as a portico or colonnade associated with a domus comparable to the House with the Large Peristyle at Vieux-la-Romaine. The column appears to have belonged to a substantial monument, possibly a portico or another commemorative structure. In 1857, discoveries made along the decumanus maximus included a colonnaded building, a basin connected to an urban aqueduct, and a nymphaeum covering approximately 165–170 m².

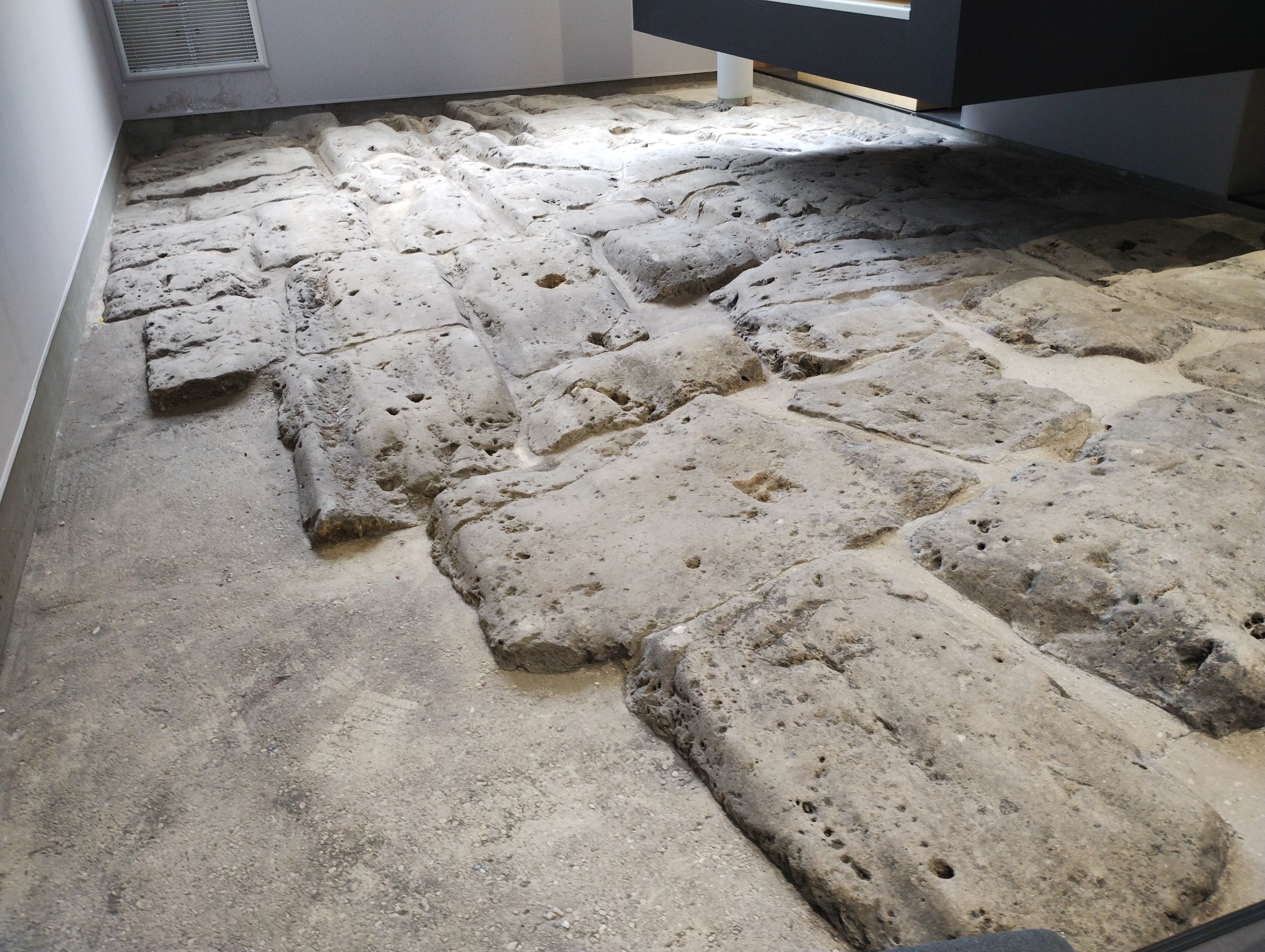
Section of Roman road preserved in the current media library in Lisieux.

The dating of the monument has been subject to scholarly discussion. Raymond Lantier placed the remains in the 3rd century, specifically between 225 and 250, (Note: Delacampagne 1990, p. 100) (Note: Collectif 2001, p. 1032) while Claude Lemaître proposed a date in the second quarter of the 2nd century. A publication from the 1990s associated the column with other buildings from the 2nd century. Elisabeth Deniaux suggested a more precise dating to the mid-2nd century, (Note: Deniaux et al. 2002, p. 142) noting stylistic similarities with the mausoleum of Neumagen.

Lemaître also drew a comparison between the column of Lisieux and the Porte Noire of Besançon, dated to 172–180, characterized by a baroque and elaborate decorative style. The column may date to the reign of Marcus Aurelius, when the Lexovian city undertook significant construction projects beginning in the 160s, though an alternative attribution to the Severan dynasty has also been proposed.

According to Claude Lemaître, the remains were not located within the Late Empire enclosure, although they are situated nearby. This contrasts with the view of François Cottin, who described the monument as being “inside the enclosure, close to it and overlooking it.” Cottin also suggested that the construction may have been commissioned by two individuals, possibly duumvirs, under the authority of the local Senate following earlier destructions, and that its date was later than that of the Late Empire enclosure. This hypothesis is no longer considered valid.

=== Rediscovery and enhancement ===
==== False lead: the connection with remains found in the 17th century ====
Elements potentially related to the column may have been uncovered in the early 17th century, between 1618 and 1619. (Note: Duval 1962, p. 359) Four bas-reliefs carved on the large faces of a quadrangular block were recorded by Nicolas-Claude Fabri de Peiresc. According to Georges Huard, it is plausible that this block formed the base of the monument. Two sides of the block feature depictions of Hercules and Mercury. Peiresc, who did not observe the full block, recorded the inscription ara lexoviensis based on drawings sent by Marin Bourgeoys, a resident of Lisieux. In the mid-19th century, Louis Dubois described a block depicting Jupiter, Venus, and Mercury.

Claude Lemaître rejects the hypothesis that the 17th-century block is associated with the column, noting that the block is carved on all four sides, whereas the column, which was positioned against a wall, would have required a base carved on only three sides. He therefore proposes that Lisieux may have contained two distinct commemorative or votive columns.

==== Discovery of remains during clearances after the Second World War ====
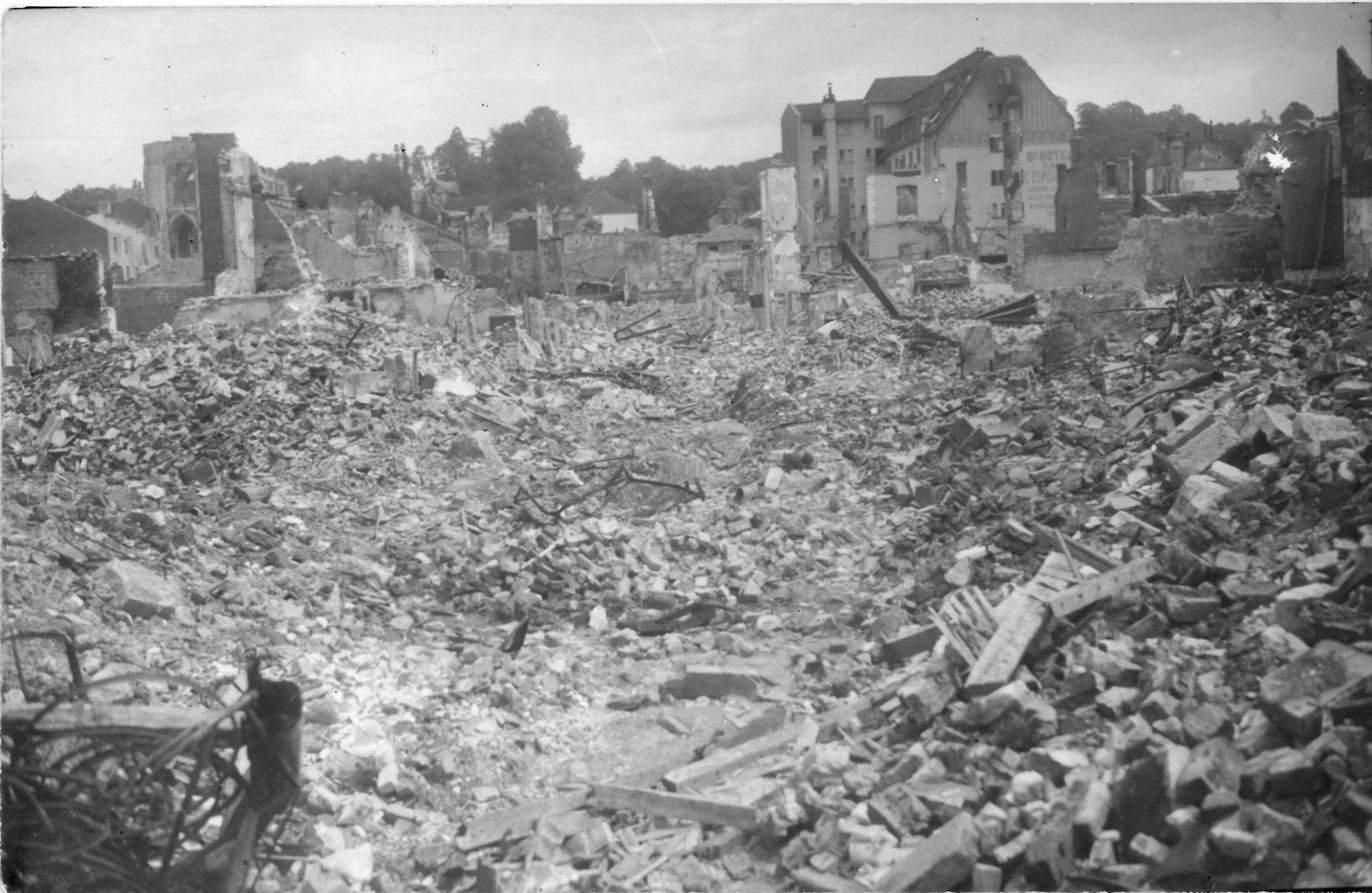
Downtown Lisieux after the Allied bombings of June 6 and 7, 1944.

The remains were uncovered during reconstruction works on Place Victor-Hugo, following extensive damage to the city during the Battle of Normandy. Some sources indicate that the discovery occurred beneath Place de la Résistance.

Fragments of the column were found at the foot of the Saint-Jacques plateau, near Rue aux Fèvres, (Note: Lantier 1959, p. 339) in 1947. The clearing of rubble was overseen by François Cottin (1903–1977), a native of Lisieux and member of the Society of Antiquaries of Normandy and the Historical Society of Lisieux. In a 1957 monograph on the city in antiquity, Cottin highlighted the significance of the monument as the only known example of its kind in the region. Later sources place the discovery at Place Charles-de-Gaulle, with Claude Lemaître specifying the corner of Place Charles-de-Gaulle and Rue de la Résistance. The remains were found in situ.

Elements of interlocking columns identified during post-1945 clearance operations were subsequently lost. Excavations at the Michelet necropolis in the early 1990s uncovered a column fragment featuring a sculpted mask, which had been reused as part of a sarcophagus.

==== Reconstruction and enhancement ====
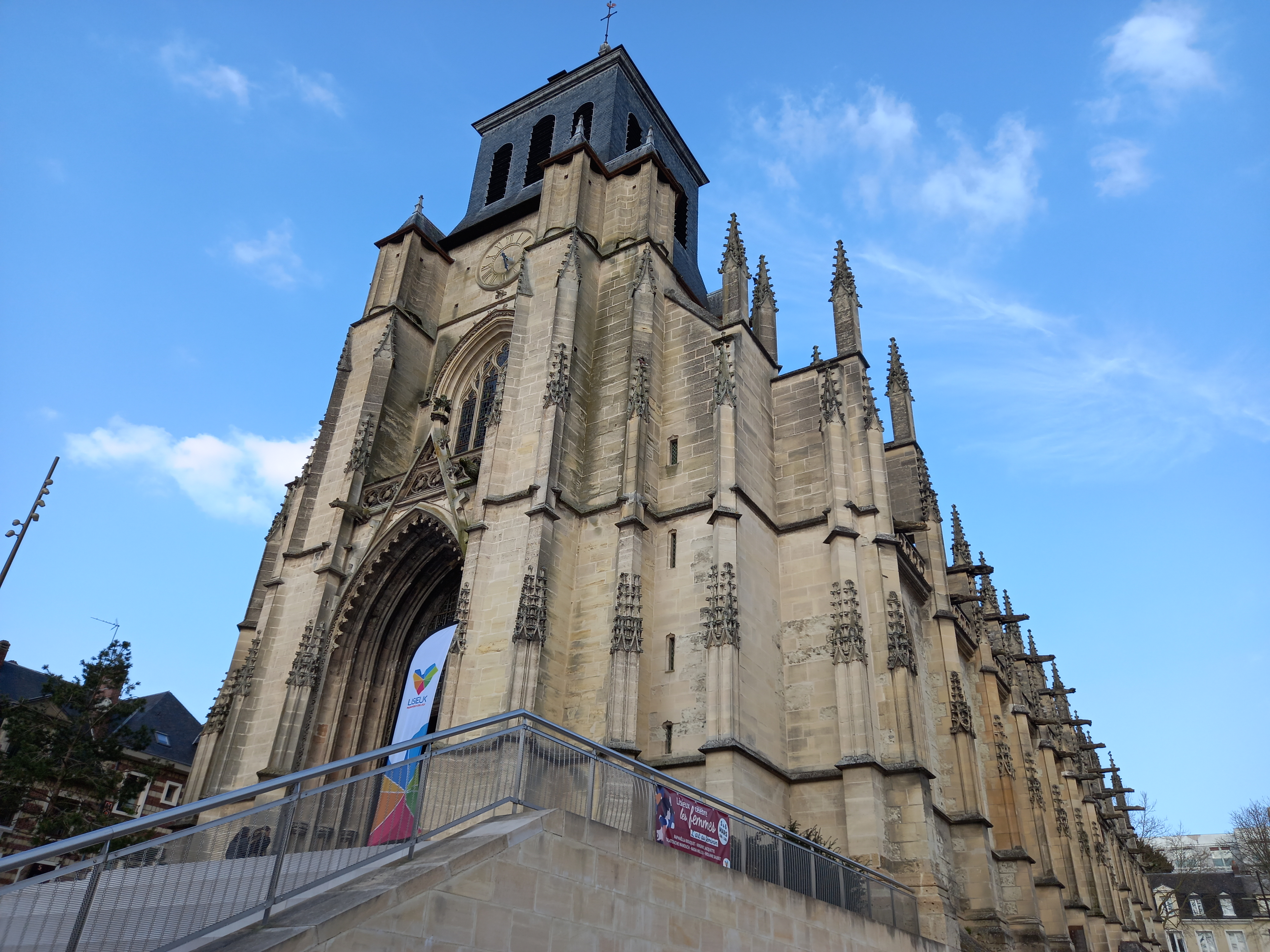
The former Saint-Jacques Church.

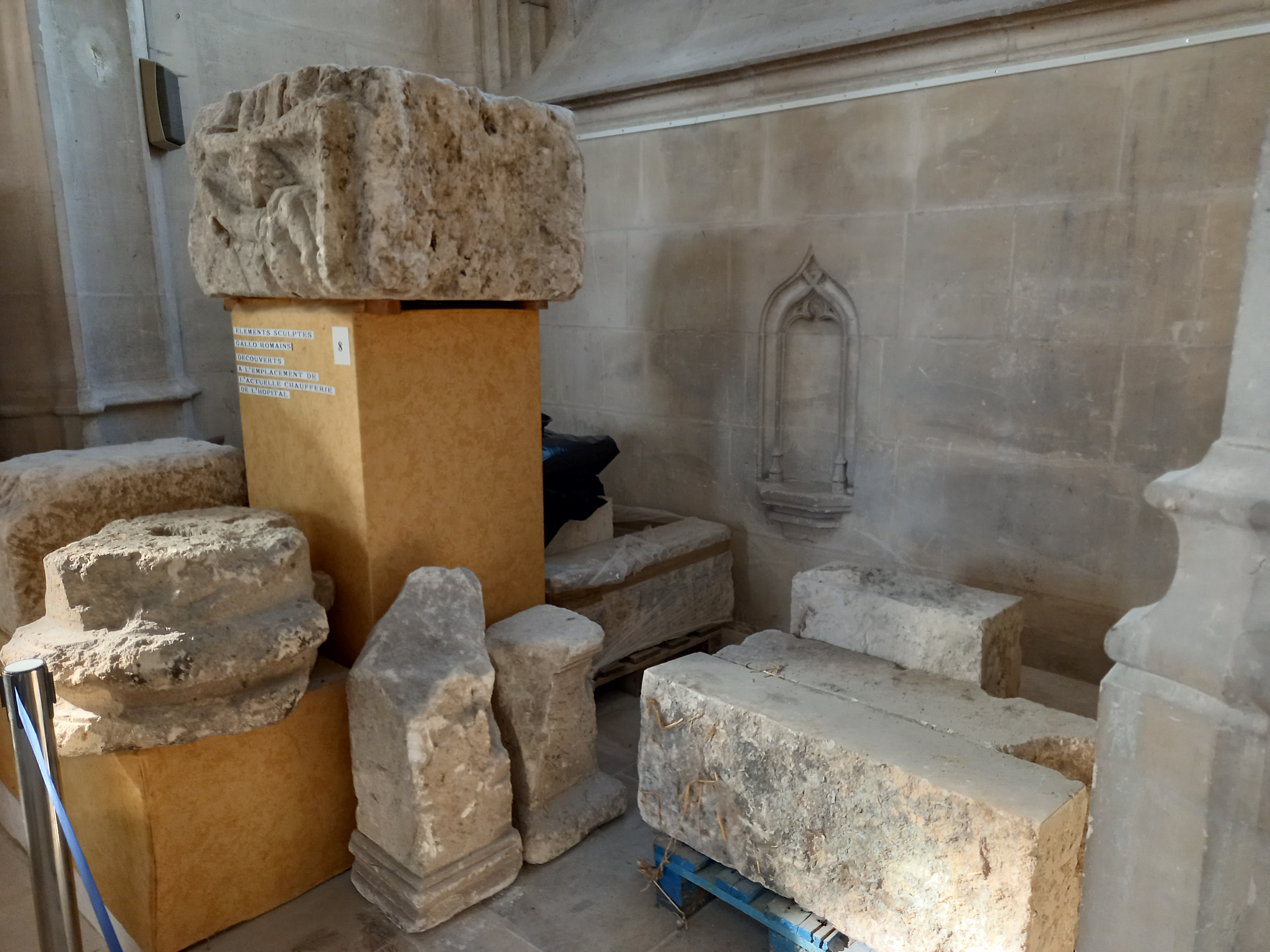
Gallo-Roman stone fragments preserved in the Saint-Jacques Market Hall in 2022.

The monument was reconstructed in the 1960s based on François Cottin’s studies, with the addition of a base and two column drums. The reconstructed base measures approximately 0.90 m by 0.75 m.

In 1965, the column was re-erected on Rue du Pont-Mortain, in Square André-Malraux, near the site of the current municipal media library. Toward the end of the 1980s, it was moved to Saint-Jacques Church, where it remained at the beginning of the 21st century, alongside other Gallo-Roman stone elements uncovered at the site of the Lisieux hospital.

== Description ==
=== General description ===
The total height of the monument has been estimated at 4.80 m, with the column itself having a diameter of approximately 0.43 m. Columns of this type often featured two superimposed bases, which could bear representations of deities or inscriptions.

According to Claude Lemaître, the monument originally consisted of six drums and a capital, in addition to its plinth. Three drums have been recovered, although Patrice Lajoye records only two. The drums measure approximately 0.76 m in height with a diameter of 0.37 m, 0.98 m in height with a diameter of 0.45 m, and 0.73 m in height with a diameter of 0.44 m. (Note: Lantier 1959, p. 340)

A Corinthian capital adorned with acanthus leaves was also found; Claude Lemaître describes its workmanship as mediocre. The column base is identified as Attic in style by François Cottin, and the presence of two superimposed bases is considered likely.

The monument is constructed from limestone sourced from the Lisieux area. Two of the drums are made of coralline limestone, while the drum supporting the Corinthian capital is made of oolite. (Note: Lantier 1959, pp. 339–340) François Cottin suggests that the use of different materials reflects the greater ease of carving the capital with a drill.

The rear faces of the drums are largely uncarved, except for a vertical band approximately 15 cm wide, indicating that the column was originally placed against a wall of a larger structure, with the exception of the terminal capital. Cottin proposes that the column may have been positioned against the enclosure.

=== Hypotheses concerning the top of the column ===
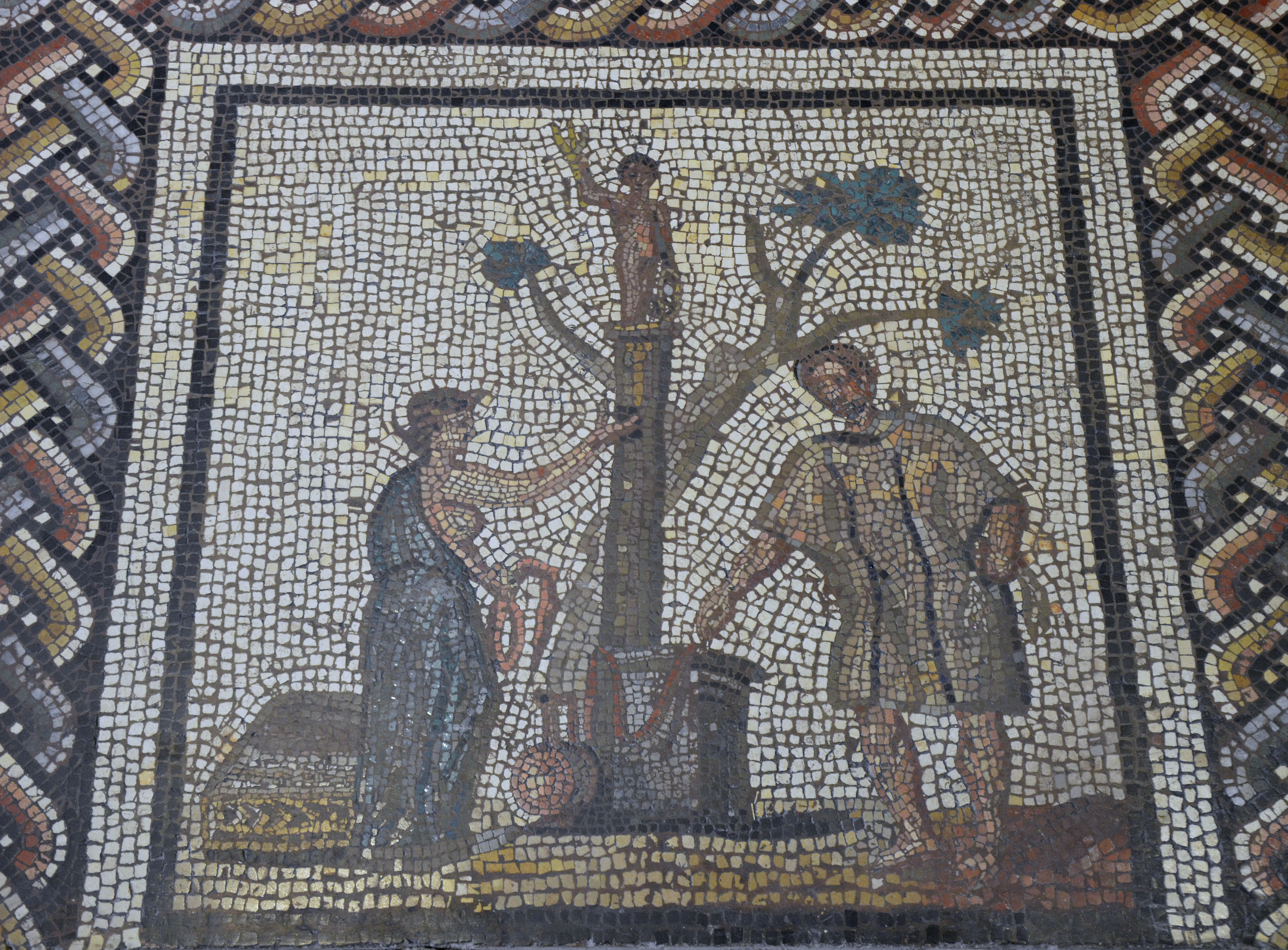
Scene from the mosaic at Saint-Romain-en-Gal.

The monument may have originally supported a statue, as suggested by a mortise on the capital. Alternatively, the mortise could represent a feature from the column’s construction process. No remnants of a statue have been recovered.

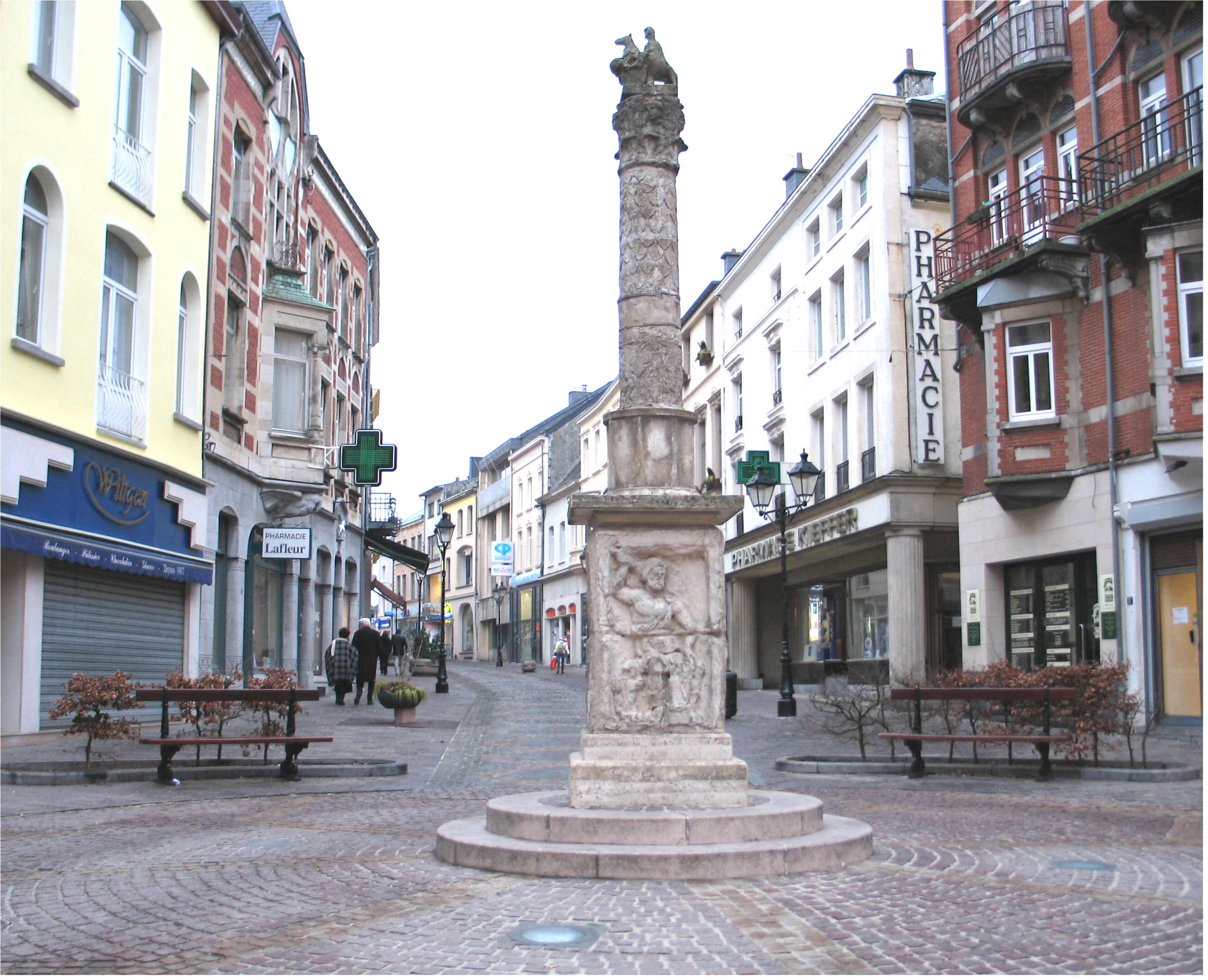
Column with an anguipede located in the present-day city of Arlon, Belgium.

Scholars have proposed several hypotheses regarding the deity represented on the column. Candidates include Mercury, Apollo, or Jupiter, with Mercury considered the most plausible for adorning the block. The crowning statue may have depicted Jupiter in different forms, such as Jupiter Anguiped, Jupiter with a wheel, or a classical representation of the god. According to François Cottin, the statue represents the chief deity of the Greco-Roman pantheon. The Jupiter Anguiped type depicts a horseman wielding a thunderbolt and confronting a monster, symbolizing the triumph of celestial light over hidden or subterranean forces, and potentially representing victory over the Barbarians. Such columns from the 3rd century have sometimes been associated with Concord. The Jupiter-with-the-wheel motif perhaps relates to the Celtic god Taranis. Classical representations of Jupiter appear on monuments such as the Pillar of the Boatmen and various columns in Mainz, a reconstruction favored by Claude Lemaître. A mosaic from Saint-Romain-en-Gal, now in the National Archaeological Museum, shows a deity placed on a column, identified as Jupiter by Gilbert Charles-Picard.

=== Scenes depicted ===
==== General considerations ====
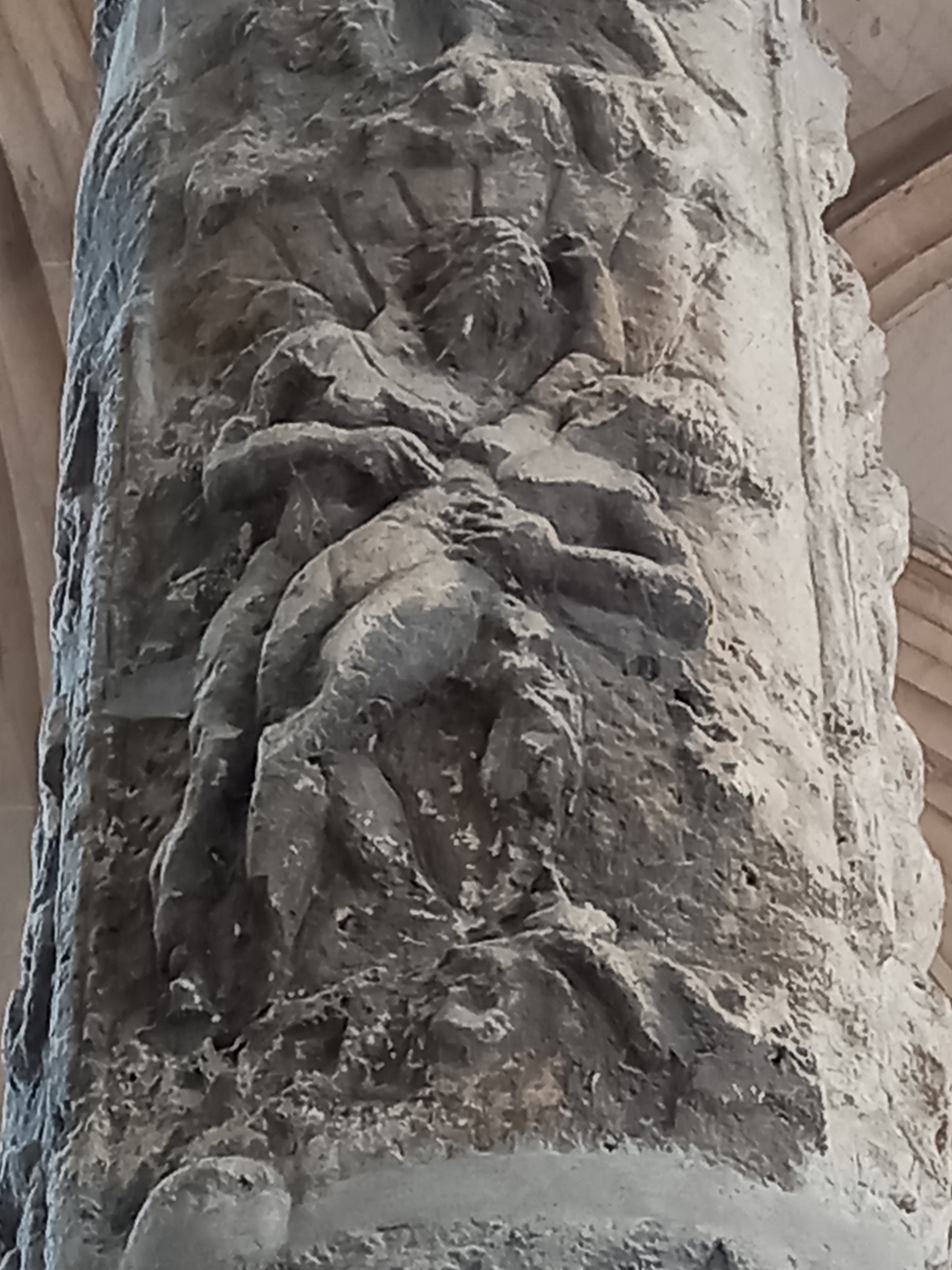
Scene of Apollo's abduction of Daphne.

The monument preserves figurative scenes, including an abduction, Venus at her toilette, a dancing nymph, and a sacrifice, as well as braided and spiral motifs. Although many of the motifs are badly damaged, they are considered of high quality. (Note: Deniaux et al. 2002, p. 141)

The preserved decoration is incomplete, and not all surviving drums are sculpted. (Note: Lantier 1959, p. 345) The drum featuring scenes with figures was located in the lower part of the column, while one drum above the presumed altar is missing.

The column’s decoration combines civil, religious, and mythological themes, depicting both divine and human spheres. Jupiter, described as the “Ruler of the World,” is placed at the top. The composition exhibits an ascending dynamic, with vertical emphasis for divine figures and horizontal emphasis for civil and religious scenes. The superposition of religious and secular imagery presents interpretive challenges. (Note: Deniaux et al. 2002, pp. 141–142)

==== Mythological scenes ====
Claude Lemaître suggests that representations of deities occupied nine vertical panels on the column, three of which have been identified. One drum depicts an abduction scene, showing a man with a partially nude woman, and a scene of Venus, along with other unidentified scenes. Patrice Lajoye interprets this drum as showing Venus at her bath with Cupid, a common motif in Gallo-Roman art, and the abduction of Daphne by Apollo. Another drum includes a nude female figure, though the relief is partially lost below the chest.

A female figure at the top of the column, just below the capital, is identified as Hebe, the daughter of Jupiter and cupbearer to the gods, associated with eternal youth. Only the upper part of the body is preserved; the figure holds a veil above her head, has long hair with two curls framing the face, which shows signs of wear. Hebe also appears in the decoration of the south face of the Black Gate of Besançon and is depicted transmitting the sacrifice of Hermadion to Jupiter.

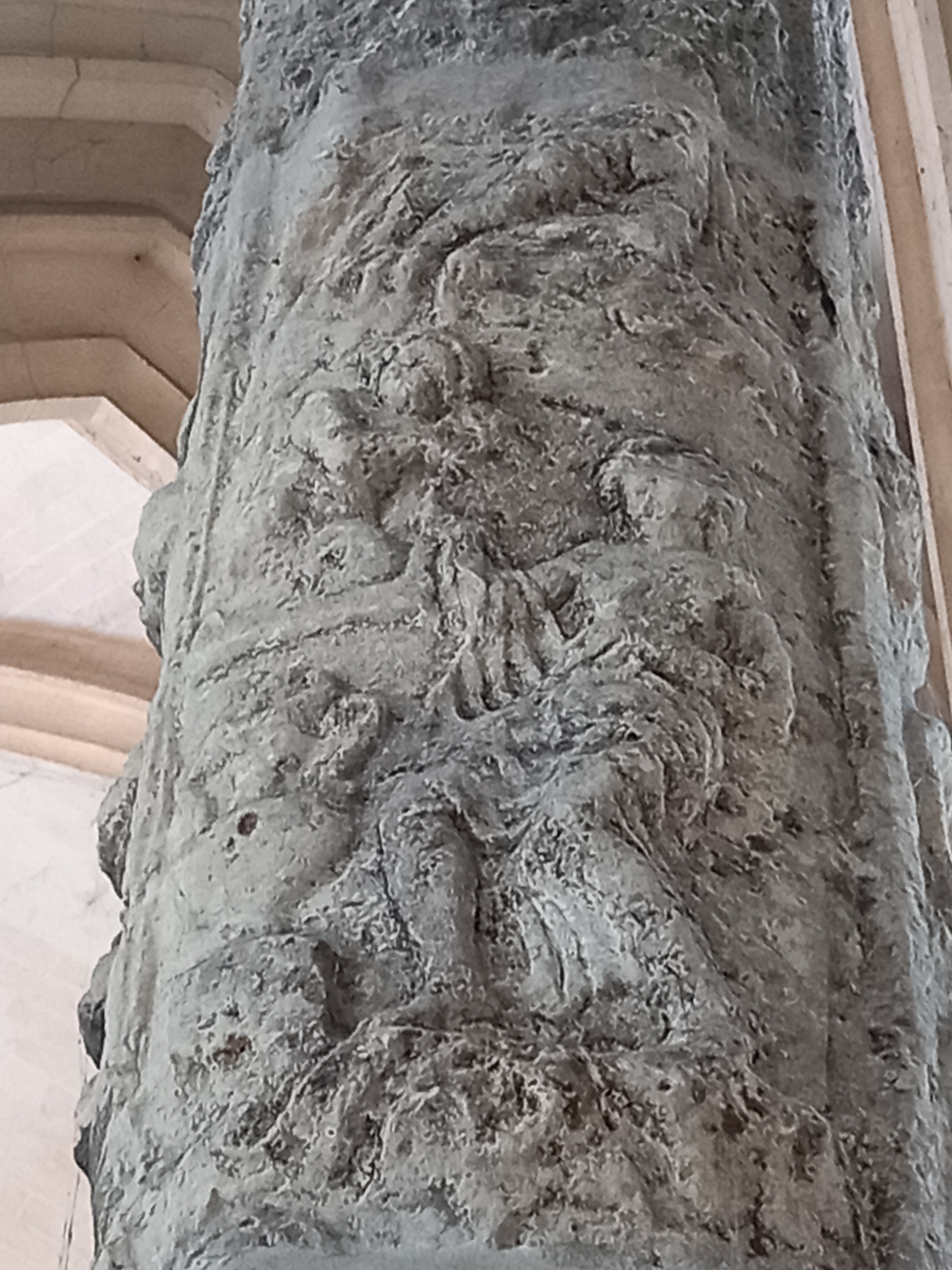
Relief de la toilette de Venus.

A young man wearing a cloak holds a nude young woman with her hair styled in a bun. Behind the male figure, seven lines represent solar rays, identifying the scene as Apollo abducting Daphne. Apollo faces Venus and wears a baldric while abducting the figure, interpreted as the personification of the dawn. Representations of Daphne’s abduction are rare in sculpture.

Other scenes depict Venus. One shows her at her toilette, with the lower body covered by drapery. In front of the goddess is a small altar with a vase featuring a bulging body and two handles. A Cupid kneels before Venus, reaching toward her. Two draped figures are also present, though they are incomplete. The motif of Venus at her toilette is common in Lexovian art.

Venus and Apollo are interpreted as dynastic deities associated with Augustus and Caesar: Venus as the mother of Aeneas, and Apollo as the god who, according to Augustan ideology, granted victory at Naulochus or Actium. These divinities symbolized vitality and renewal.

==== Scenes of religious rites and civil scenes ====
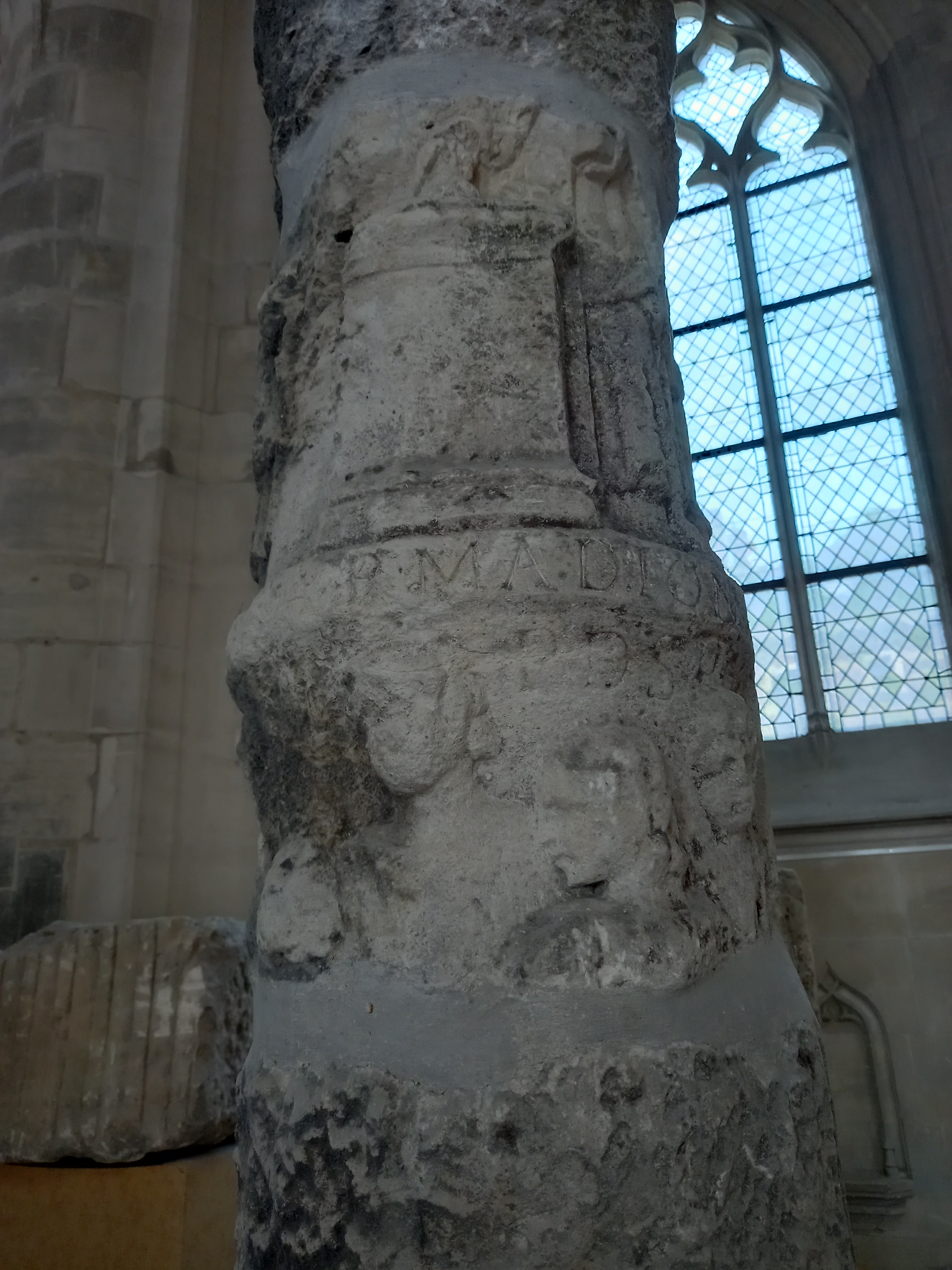
Carved altar and heads with Hermadion's inscription.

A religious scene is present along with another civil scene, although both scenes are incomplete. A band separates them. The civil scene is located on the lower part and the religious scene on the upper part of the column. There is a concern for balance in the representation of the civil and religious scenes, with a vertical and diagonal axis, showing “a concern for balance reinforcing their complementarity,” a balance strengthened by inscriptions.

An incompletely preserved inscription located between two scenes bears the name “HERMADION,” more precisely rendered as “IAPROC HERMADION.” The inscription was damaged when the column was exposed outdoors in Square André-Malraux. The letters measure between 25 and 35 millimeters and are engraved horizontally. A second inscription, “SC L PDSD,” appears on the lower register between heads, with letters measuring approximately 45 millimeters. The abbreviations indicate that the structure was erected at the expense of the local senate. The inscriptions are associated with the figurative scenes and are fragmentary, which complicates their interpretation.

A partially preserved sacrificial scene is located on the upper part of the column, with some figures damaged. The scene depicts a classical offering in Roman religion and includes four figures. One central figure, described as complementary or subordinate, performs a libation on a quadrangular altar. Steps behind the altar suggest that the scene is set outdoors, in front of a temple, indicating an official ceremony. The figure identified as Hermadion appears to offer wine and incense in honor of Jupiter and the emperor, representing the guarantors of Roman peace.

The relief includes a limited number of furnishings and figures. The central figure is described as young and beardless, wearing a tunic or toga, and may originally have worn a veil, as in traditional representations of sacrifices; this part of the relief is now lost. The figure holds a box or casket.

One of the figures is identified as Hermadion, who is positioned above five other figures. Among these, one wears a Gallic garment, the cucullus. According to Elisabeth Deniaux, four figures are present, two of whom wear Gallic clothing. An altar is located near the figure in a toga. Among the five figures, one appears to be an attendant holding a patera in the left hand and a ewer in the right; this part of the relief is heavily damaged. Two figures in short tunics, possibly assistants responsible for carrying offerings or playing music, descend a staircase, which may symbolically represent a temple not depicted in the relief. Five male heads are present without bodies. The lower parts of the figures were originally on a drum that has not been preserved. In total, six male figures are represented in the civil scene.

The lower part of the column features figures, although the scene is difficult to interpret. The central figure appears to be dominant, while a figure on the right may serve to connect the sculpted figures with the surrounding space. Some scholars have suggested that the portraits could represent the ceremony associated with the erection of the column, though the scene may also have had a primarily decorative function.

== Interpretation ==
The preservation of the remains presents challenges for interpretation. In 1994, scholars noted a lack of in-depth study despite an extensive bibliography. Variations in construction materials and the condition of the fragments necessitate caution when analyzing the monument.

=== Epigraphic remains difficult to interpret ===
Partial Roman inscription on the column.

The inscription has been the subject of multiple interpretations. In 1959, Raymond Lantier considered it a dedication of the monument, suggesting that Hermadion was either the sculptor or a wealthy merchant of eastern origin; the merchant hypothesis was later rejected by Claude Lemaître.

In 1966, Françoise Durand reconstructed the inscription as proc(urator) Hermadion, interpreting Hermadion as a procurator and Hermes as a protective figure for the city of the Lexovii. She further proposed the reading S(enatus) C(onsulto) L(ibens) P(ecunia) S(ua) D(edit) D(edicavit), indicating that the local senate sponsored the monument. By 1984, Hermadion was interpreted as the central figure in the sacrificial scene, representing a magistrate acting on behalf of the Roman senate or the emperor; the senate in question was local, since the province of Lyonnaise was under imperial administration.

In 1992, Guillaume Sallard proposed an expanded reading of the inscription as “M(arcus) Proc(ulus) Hermadion S(acerdos) C(ivitatis) L(exoviorum) P(osuit) D(e) S(uo) D(ono)”, which he interpreted as indicating that Marcus Proculus Hermadion, priest of the city of the Lexovii, erected the monument as a personal offering. Claude Lemaître rejected this interpretation, noting that the inscription begins with “IA” and that Proculus is not a gentilice. He also dismissed the hypothesis that the first name could be IA(nius). In Roman cities, official cults were typically organized through two colleges: the decurions and the college of Augustales, the latter composed of freedmen or foreigners meeting moral qualifications, a system that facilitated integration into the social hierarchy of the civitas.

Claude Lemaître considers that the missing base of the column would normally have borne the dedication. The preserved fragments include the formula “PDSD” (Pecunia d(e) s(uo) d(edit)), which may have been intended to explain the civil and religious scenes, although this interpretation is considered hypothetical. Several expansions of the abbreviation have been proposed, including Pecunia sua dedit dedicavit, posuit de suo dono, and pecunia de sua dedit, described by Lemaître as formulas of a private character, while alternatives such as pecuniat de sua dedit or publice de sua dedit would indicate an official context.

The abbreviation SC is interpreted as referring to the senate of the Lexovii, with the letter L representing the city, a practice also attested on the Frénouville milestone.

For the representation above the altar bearing the name Hermadion, Claude Lemaître proposes the reading I(n) A(ram) Proc(urator) Hermadion, indicating that the procurator Hermadion performed a sacrifice.

Lemaître further suggests the full dedication as S(enatus) C(ivitatis) L(exoviorum) P(ublice) D(e) S(ua) D(edit) I(n) A(ram) Proc(urator) Hermadion. The dedication to the divinity and the emperor may have been inscribed on a now-lost band or on the missing base of the column. According to the same author, this dedication would likely have included the formula I(ovi) O(ptimo) M(aximo) Aug(usto) Sac(rum).

=== Belonging to a model present in eastern Gaul ===
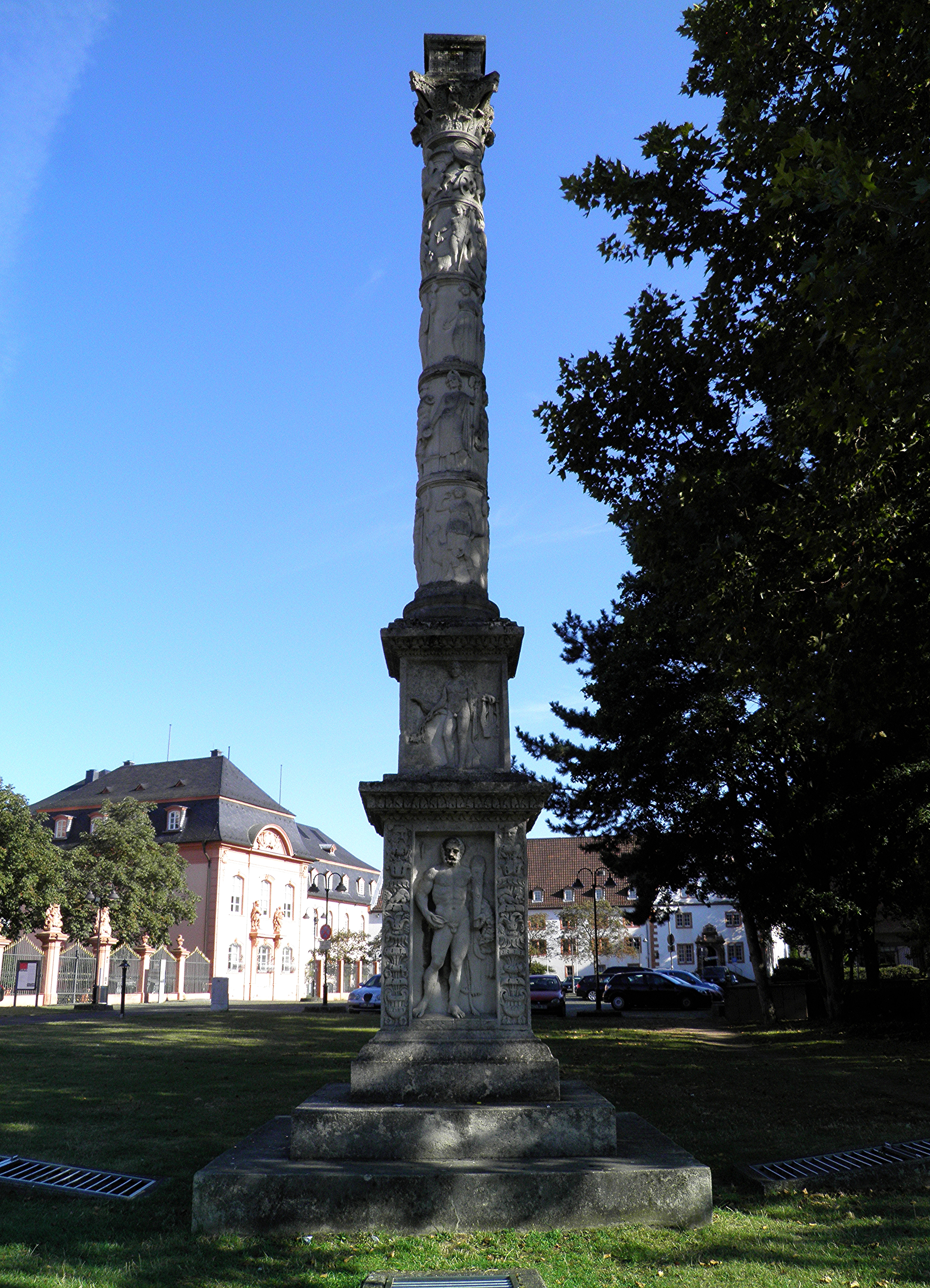
Reconstruction of the Great Column of Jupiter in Mainz, discovered in 1904–1905.

Claude Lemaître identifies the column of Lisieux as dedicated to Jupiter based on its decoration and inscriptions. The themes represented on the column may correspond to motifs found on terra sigillata ceramics, including examples from Lezoux discovered at Lisieux and dated to the late 2nd and 3rd centuries.

The excavator noted stylistic and thematic similarities with Rhenish bas-reliefs, an interpretation also supported by Raymond Lantier and Elisabeth Deniaux. The column of Lisieux has been compared to votive columns in eastern Gaul, such as those at Merten, Ehrang, Mainz, and Anguiped columns, which were common in eastern Gaul and Germania. Among these, the column of Mainz is considered the best-preserved example.

The column of Lisieux provides new insight into the distribution of this type of monument. In the late 1950s, such structures were considered absent in Lyonnaise II. Anguiped columns are also attested in western regions, including Armorica. On the eve of the 1960s, the former territory of Lower Normandy was considered to have few examples of Gallo-Roman sculpture. Two drums discovered in 1992 on rue des Carmes in Rouen may have belonged to a column dedicated to Jupiter, located near a cardo and a thermal complex. This type of column represents a widespread form of monument in the Gallic and Germanic provinces, reflecting expressions of loyalty to the Roman Empire in both eastern and western regions.

=== A commemorative monument evoking local political structures ===
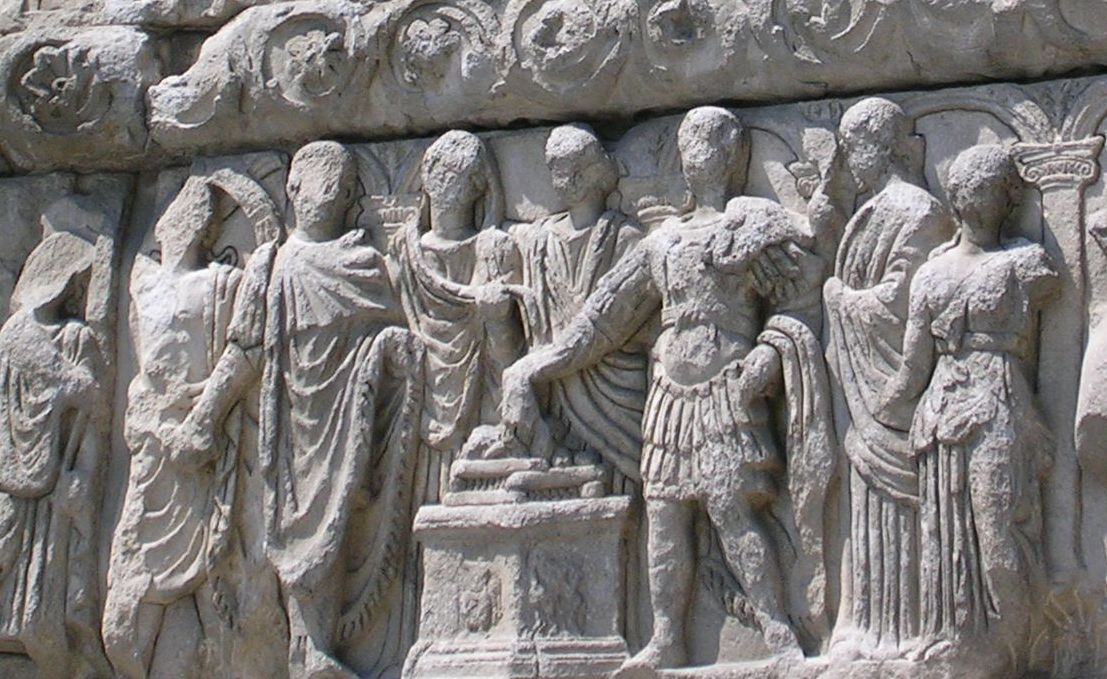
Sacrifice of Galerius and his family to the Roman gods for his victory on the Arch of Galerius in Thessaloniki.

The column of Lisieux can be compared thematically with the Pillar of the Boatmen, dated to the reign of Tiberius, which presents both civil and religious scenes, depicting members of a corporation or magistrates alongside administrative participants. It can also be compared to the reliefs of the Arch of Galerius in Thessaloniki, which include a sacrificial scene. The monument’s design shows Greco-Roman, and possibly Hellenistic, influences.

The column appears to have a commemorative function. Monuments of this type were typically commissioned by local notables, professional associations, or civic authorities. Its sculpted decoration has been described as “historical narrative panels of a local character.”

The decoration of the monument, which includes both civil and sacred themes, appears to reflect the intentions of the sponsor. The scenes are depicted in a realistic and formal style, including representations of two individuals leaving a sanctuary. The monument has an official character, although no procuratorial function was associated with the ordo decurionum. Hermadion was part of the Western Roman administrative world. Under the Severan dynasty, jurists of the fisc were incorporated into the body of procurators. The inscription does not clarify Hermadion’s exact role, whether as a procurator of equestrian rank or as an imperial freedman serving as procurator. The equestrian order typically provided personnel for procuratorships responsible for fiscal administration, with positions classified according to annual salary levels of 60,000, 100,000, or 200,000 sesterces; freedmen or knights could receive similar salaries. Hermadion may have served in the procuratorships of the Three Gauls.

Hermadion may have been a member of the local elite of the city of the Lexovii, participating in municipal institutions that continued traditions from the Gallic period. His actions were apparently recognized by the city through the erection of a monument. These actions may have involved public works, such as water supply projects, carried out under his supervision and at the request of local magistrates, reflecting aspects of Roman administration. The column provides evidence of the connections between the city and Roman authority.

=== A monument testifying to local elite euergetism, commercial activity, and exchanges ===
The inscription has been used for studies in onomastics, although some elements remain unclear. The name Hermadion derives from Hermes and is a diminutive form given in childhood. This Greco-Oriental name may reflect Hellenistic naming conventions rather than indicating ethnic origin. Names of Latin or Greek origin were used by slaves, but could also be borne by freeborn individuals or immigrants. The inscriptions “Iaproc” and “Hermadion” have been interpreted as two personal names, possibly referring to magistrates such as duumvirs.

Hermadion has been interpreted either as the sculptor or as the sponsor of the monument. (Note: Lantier 1959, p. 346) Some scholars have suggested he was a magistrate represented while performing official duties, possibly acting on behalf of the local senate or associated with a procuratorship of the census. Individuals named Hermadion appear in various inscriptions and may have been slaves, freedmen, freeborn persons, or citizens. Several bear names linked to the emperor Claudius or the Flavian dynasty. Hermadion may also have had commercial connections, particularly if of servile origin, and some individuals with this name are associated with the cult of Mithras, which became widespread from the 2nd century onward.

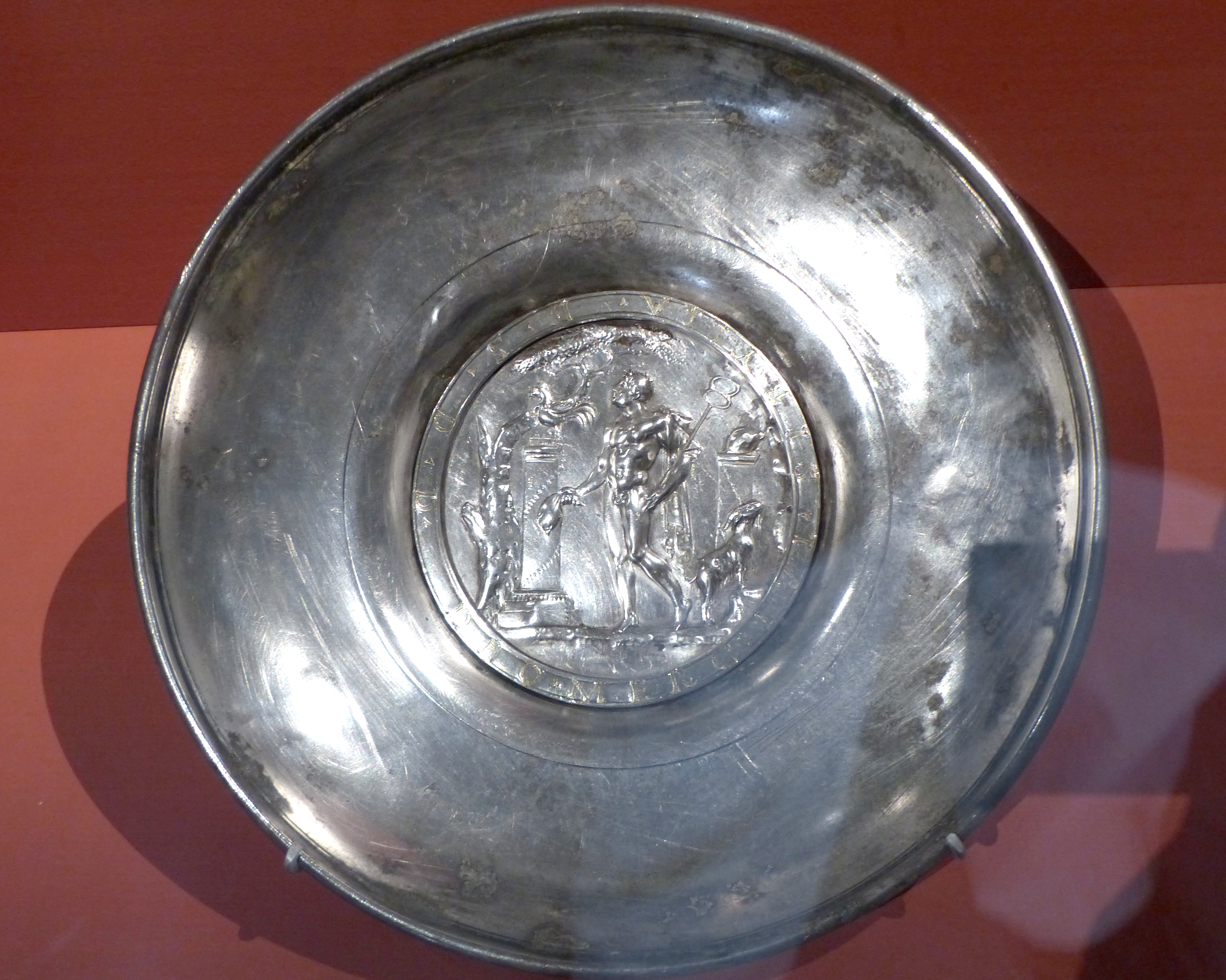
A phiale from the Berthouville treasure depicting Mercury with a caduceus.

The city of the Lexovii included foreigners, as evidenced by the donor of a piece of the Berthouville treasure, Eutichus, possibly dating from before the reign of Hadrian. This suggests commercial exchanges through the port of ancient Lisieux and highlights the city’s economic role in the 2nd century. The column reflects the Hellenization of the local elite, with contributions from eastern Gaul and the provinces of Germania at the end of the 2nd and beginning of the 3rd century. It demonstrates the integration of the local elite into the Roman world through a monument with a complex iconographic and epigraphic program. The column was erected near a nymphaeum, indicating a cultic context associated with water, similar to columns of Jupiter placed within sanctuaries at Tongeren and Bierbach. Its iconographic program shows a level of coherence comparable to these examples.

== See also ==
- History of Normandy
- Great Mainz Jupiter Column
- Pillar of the Boatmen

== Bibliography ==
=== General works ===
- Delacampagne, Florence (1990). Carte archéologique de la Gaule, 14. Le Calvados [Archaeological map of Gaul, 14. Calvados] (in French). Paris: Éd. de la Maison des sciences de l'homme. ISBN 2-87754-011-1.
- Deniaux, Elisabeth; Lorren, Claude; Bauduin, Pierre; Jarry, Thomas (2002). La Normandie avant les Normands, de la conquête romaine à l'arrivée des Vikings [Normandy before the Normans, from the Roman conquest to the arrival of the Vikings] (in French). Rennes: Ouest-France.
- Collectif (2001). Le patrimoine des communes du Calvados [The heritage of the municipalities of Calvados] (in French). Paris: Flohic. ISBN 2-84234-111-2.
- Duval, Paul-Marie (1962). "Chronique gallo-romaine" [Gallo-Roman chronicle]. Revue des Études Anciennes (in French). 64-3-4: 326–377.

=== Works on Lisieux in Antiquity or on the column ===
- Cottin, François (1957). "Noviomagus Lexioviorum des temps les plus anciens à la fin de l'époque romaine" [Noviomagus Lexioviorum from the earliest times to the end of the Roman era]. Bulletin de la Société des antiquaires de Normandie (in French). LIII (1955–1956): 169–196.
- Huard, Georges (1959). "Des dessins de Peiresc représentant un monument gallo-romain de Lisieux" [Drawings by Peiresc depicting a Gallo-Roman monument in Lisieux]. Bulletin de la Société nationale des Antiquaires de France (in French). 1957: 80–84.
- Lajoye, Patrice (2012). Religions et cultes à Lisieux (Normandie) dans l'Antiquité et au haut Moyen Âge [Religions and worship in Lisieux (Normandy) in Antiquity and the Early Middle Ages] (in French).
- Lantier, Raymond (1959). "Découvertes archéologiques à Lisieux (Calvados)" [Archaeological discoveries in Lisieux (Calvados)]. Comptes rendus des séances de l'Académie des Inscriptions et Belles-Lettres (in French). 103–2: 338–346.
- Lemaître, Claude (1985). "Lisieux dans l'Antiquité" [Lisieux in Antiquity]. Art de Basse-Normandie (in French) (89-90-91): 12–29.
- Lemaître, Claude (2002). "La colonne votive de Lisieux" [The votive column of Lisieux]. Histoire et traditions populaires (in French) (79): 23–32.
- Lemaître, Claude (2009). "La colonne votive de Lisieux" [The votive column of Lisieux]. Bulletin de la société historique de Lisieux (in French) (67): 23–99.
- Mandy, Bernard; Pilet, Christian (1994). Lisieux avant l'an mil : Essai de reconstitution [Lisieux before the year 1000: An attempt at reconstruction] (in French). Lisieux: Ville de Lisieux. ISBN 2-9508063-1-7.
- Paillard, Didier; Alduc-Le Bagousse, Armelle (2022). La nécropole Michelet. Bilan et perspectives des recherches sur la cité de Lisieux (Calvados) de ses origines au IXe siècle [The Michelet Necropolis. Review and prospects for research on the city of Lisieux (Calvados) from its origins to the 9th century] (in French). Caen: Presses universitaires de Caen. ISBN 978-2-38185-170-9.
