= Great Mainz Jupiter Column =

Roman column monument dedicated to Jupiter in Mainz

Coordinates: 50°00′19″N 8°16′14″E

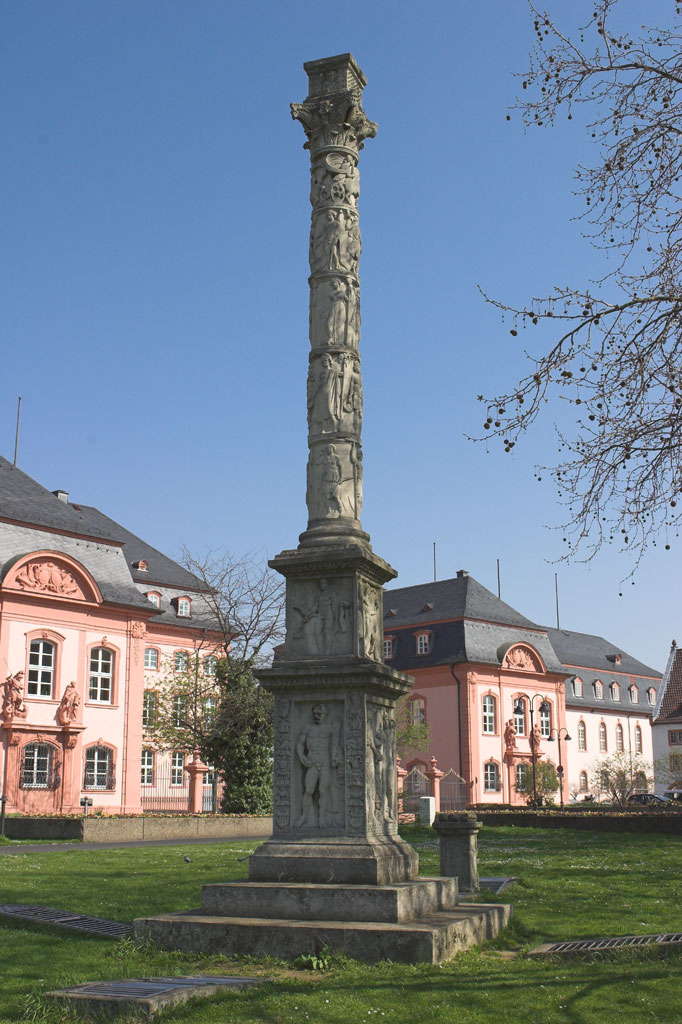
The Great Mainz Jupiter Column (replica in front of the Landtag of Rhineland-Palatinate, Mainz)

The Great Mainz Jupiter Column is a civilian monument erected in the second half of the 1st century in Mogontiacum (present-day Mainz) in honor of the Roman god Jupiter. It is the oldest, largest, and most elaborate Jupiter column discovered to date in the German-speaking region. The Great Mainz Jupiter Column served as a model for further Jupiter columns, primarily erected in the 2nd and 3rd centuries in the Roman provinces of Germania Inferior (Lower Germany) and Germania Superior (Upper Germany). It was destroyed in the late period of the Roman Empire and rediscovered in 1904/05. Today, the reconstructed remains can be viewed in the Stone Hall of the Landesmuseum Mainz. Copies of the Great Mainz Jupiter Column are located in Mainz itself, at Saalburg Castle, in Saint-Germain-en-Laye, and in Rome.

== Historical background ==
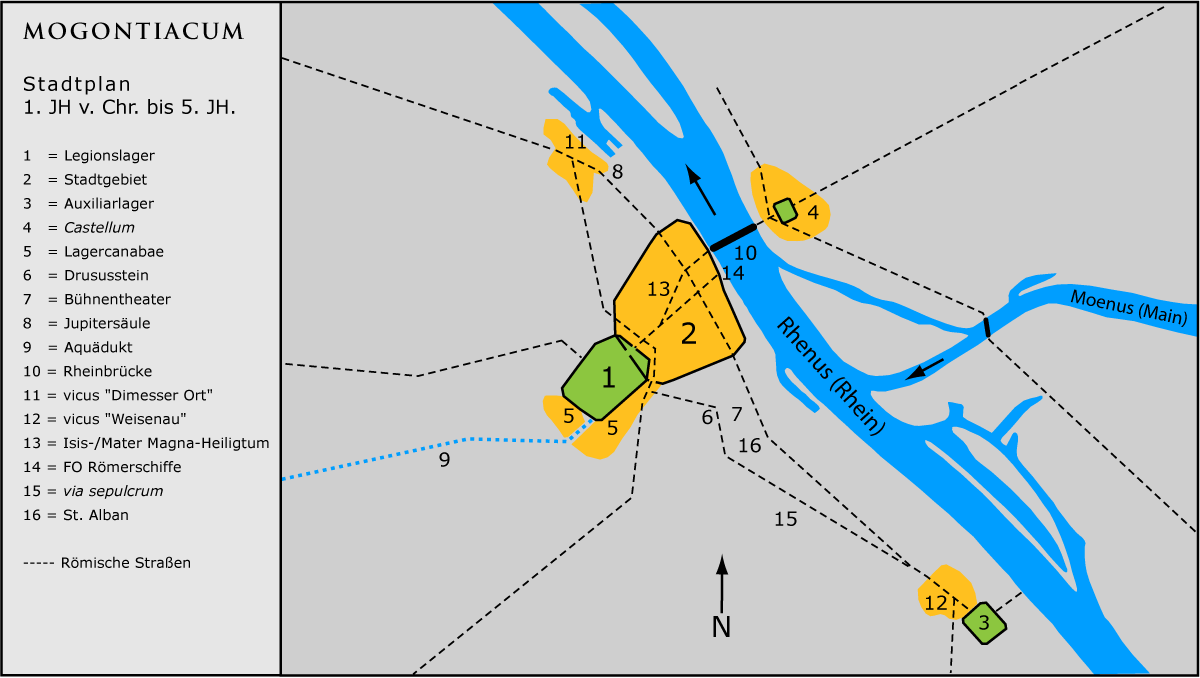
Location of the Great Mainz Jupiter Column and the Dimesser Ort in Mogontiacum

In 13/12 BC, the construction of a legionary camp on the Mainz Kästrich (elevation above the Rhine Valley) marked the beginning of nearly 500 years of Roman presence in Mainz. Shortly thereafter, several Canabae (civilian settlements) emerged on the slopes of the Kästrich toward the Rhine and in Weisenau, quickly developing into individual, loosely connected civilian settlements. In the area of present-day Mainz Neustadt at the level of the customs and inland port, a settlement known in specialist literature as the “Dimesser Ort” was founded. Here, likely in the first half of the 1st century, there was a naval base of the Roman Rhine fleet. Additionally, archaeological finds suggest the presence of a larger transshipment point for goods transported by ship. In expert circles, the settlement is therefore regarded as a vicus of traders and long-distance merchants. By the beginning of the second half of the 1st century, this civilian settlement must already have had significant importance for civilian life in Mainz as well as a certain level of prosperity. An interpretation as an early civilian center of Mainz at that time is also assumed. During the reign of Emperor Nero, residents (canabarii) of this settlement donated the monument now known as the Great Mainz Jupiter Column. Together with an altar stone for thank-offerings, it was erected in the settlement as a sign of their devotion and loyalty to the imperial house.

== Rediscovery and reconstruction ==
In December 1904, the then director of the Römisch-Germanisches Zentralmuseum in Mainz, Ludwig Lindenschmit, became aware of bronze fragments that construction workers were selling to a scrap metal dealer. A foot clad in a sandal and remains of a thunderbolt bundle turned out to be parts of the larger-than-life Jupiter figure. After Lindenschmit located the find site at Sömmerringstraße No. 6 in Mainz Neustadt, the remains of the Jupiter column were uncovered in several weeks of follow-up excavations in early 1905 at a depth of two and a half meters. Nearly 2,000 fragments of various sizes were recovered in total. The find situation already indicated at the time that the column's debris resulted from a systematic and planned destruction and deposition of the fragments. Lindenschmit, who enjoyed a good reputation in Europe as a conservator, reconstructed the column from the debris in meticulous work. This was facilitated by assembly marks that determined the sequence of the individual column sections and their arrangement. He later wrote about this:

The assembly of the individual members, the base, column drums, etc., was carried out in such a way that first the matching parts of the outer side, often touching only at narrow fracture points, were joined together using brass dowels and stone mastic. Where larger pieces were missing inside the column, the connection to the outer sides was made with bricks embedded in a mass made of glue and plaster to avoid unnecessarily increasing the weight.
Furthermore, the outward-facing parts were connected to each other and to the core by means of inserted metal lumps, wires, and clamps. All gaps inside and outside were filled with the aforementioned mass or stone mastic.

— Ludwig Lindenschmit

Despite the emerging supra-regional significance of the find, the Jupiter column was stored outdoors in various locations for several decades. From 1963, it was displayed in the Stone Hall (the former riding hall of the Electoral Marstall) of the present-day Landesmuseum Mainz. There, it is exhibited together with other significant stone monuments from the collection of Roman stone monuments from the Roman period in Mainz, comprising around 2,000 individual pieces. In autumn 2016, parts of the column were sent to the Fraunhofer Development Center for X-ray Technology in Erlangen for examination. There, over approximately two years of work, it is to be determined how the individual parts of the Jupiter column appeared 2,000 years ago. The replicas of the Great Mainz Jupiter Column in front of the Deutschhaus in Mainz and at the Saalburg closely follow the original. In some depictions, missing parts of the sculptures and decorative friezes have been supplemented to a minor extent. It could not be clearly determined whether the Jupiter figure was originally conceived as standing or seated. Painting of the Jupiter column can be assumed as possible but is not verifiable based on the finds. As of October 2016, the copy of the column in front of the Landtag of Rhineland-Palatinate in the Große Bleiche in Mainz is dismantled due to restoration work.

== Description and iconographic program ==
The Great Mainz Jupiter Column consists of two differently sized, almost cubic base stones and five column drums that taper slightly in diameter upward. In this section of the monument, a total of 28 different deities from Romano-Celtic mythology are depicted. Atop the column sits a richly decorated capital of the Corinthian order with a cubic finishing stone on which the Jupiter figure stood. The column measures 9.14 meters without the Jupiter figure; with the 3.36-meter-tall Jupiter figure, the Jupiter column had a total height of 12.50 meters. Like numerous other stone monuments of Roman Mogontiacum, it was made from Lorraine Keuper (limestone) from the area around Verdun.

=== Base stones ===
The two lightly profiled base stones likely stood on a multi-stepped substructure, about which nothing is known. The lower of the two base stones shows Jupiter himself on the four image sides, as well as the goddess of fortune, Fortuna, and Minerva, the goddess of wisdom. Also included are Mercury, the god of trade, and possibly Salus, the female deity of personified well-being. Depicted alone on the fourth image side is Hercules. The second base stone shows Apollo, god of music and the arts, as well as the two Dioscuri. The front side of the Jupiter column (the side facing the sacrificial altar) contains the dedicatory inscription mentioned below. In addition to the god figures, the respective image sides feature rich surrounding decoration.

Base stones (replica of the Great Mainz Jupiter Column in front of the Saalburg)

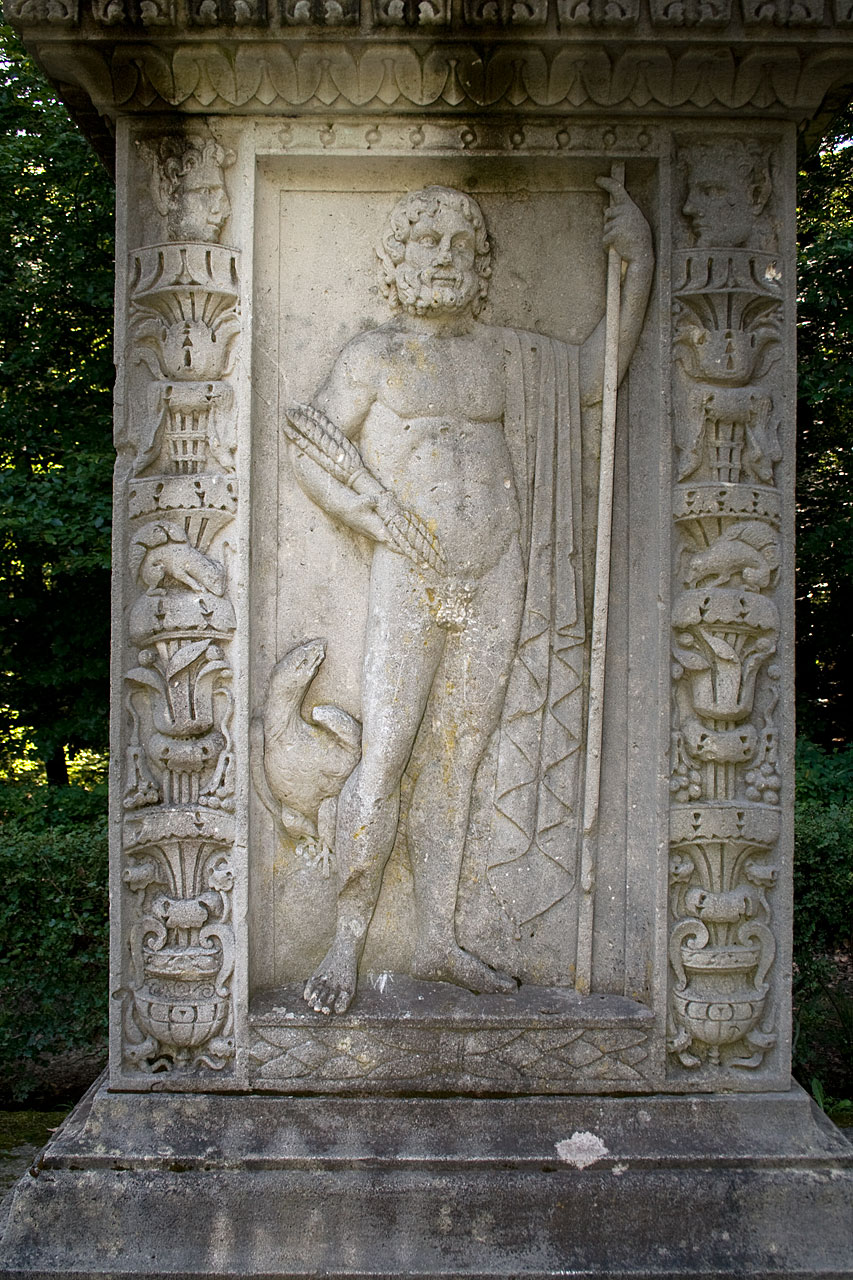
Jupiter

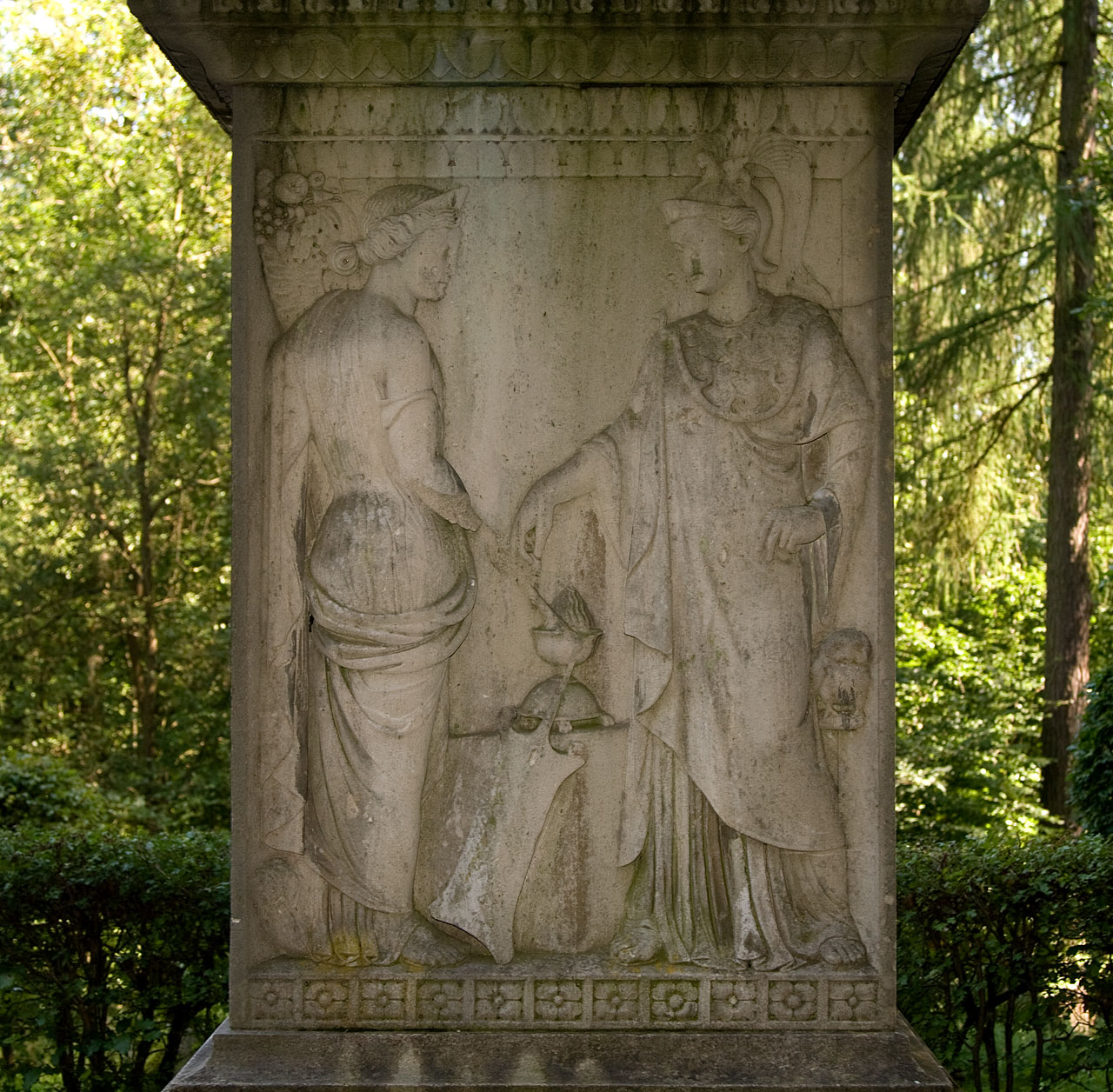
Fortuna (left) and Minerva

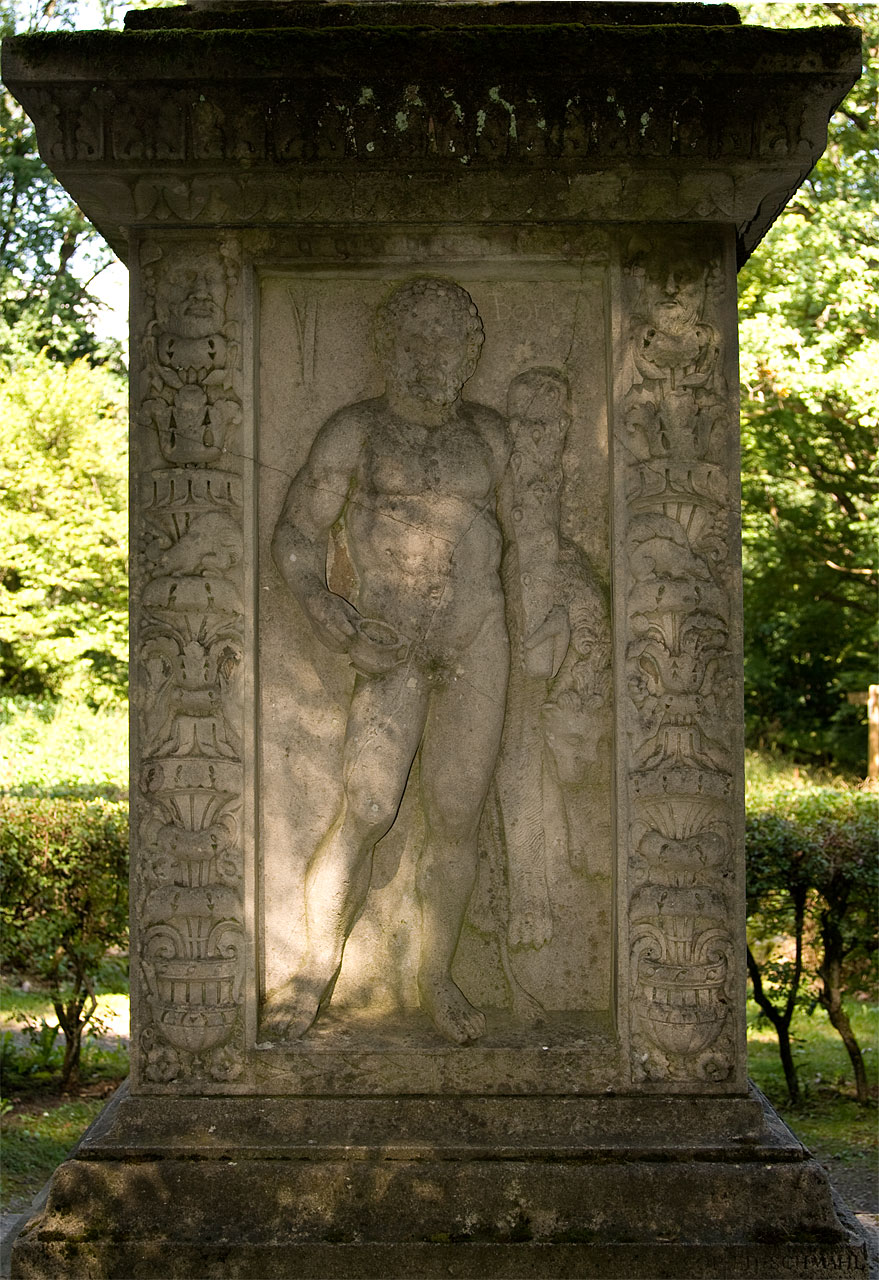
Hercules

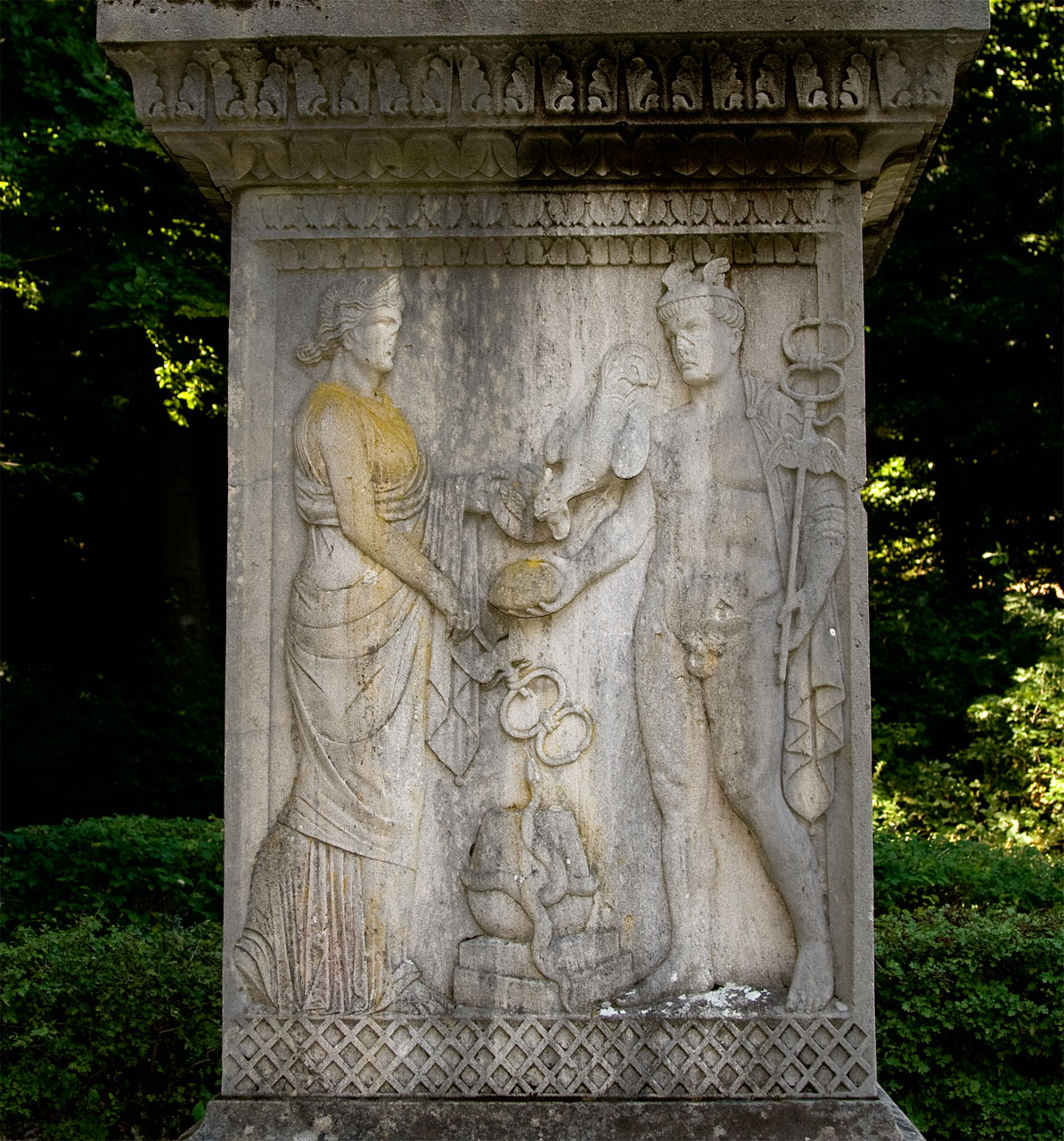
Salus (? left) and Mercury

=== Column drums ===
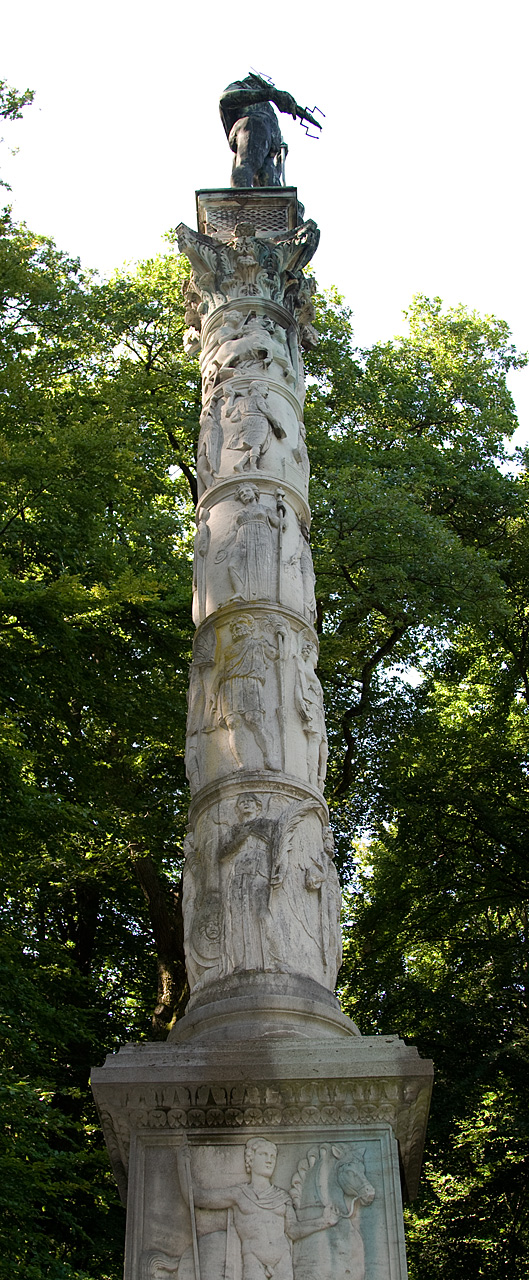
Iconographic program of the column drums (Saalburg replica)

The column drums show the following deities or personifications in ascending order, some of which cannot be identified with absolute certainty: On the lowest column drum, the sea god Neptune, Diana, the goddess of the hunt, the victory goddess Victoria, and the war god Mars are depicted. The next drum shows two female deities that could be interpreted as the city goddess Roma (?) and the vegetation goddess Ceres (?), as well as Vulcan, the god of smithing, and possibly Virtus (?), the personification of bravery. On the next column drum, none of the depicted deities can be definitively identified. Possibly shown here are the peace goddess Pax, Aequitas, the personification of justice, the household goddess Vesta, and an indeterminable female goddess. The penultimate column drum shows a person possibly representing the Genius of Nero, the wine god Bacchus, and two Lares, protective gods of Roman mythology. On the final column drum, Luna, the goddess of the moon, and Sol, the god of the sun, are depicted. Luna is shown driving a biga (two-horse chariot), while Sol drives a quadriga.

=== Capital and finishing stone ===
The Corinthian capital atop the last column drum is typically decorated with richly ornate acanthus leaves in two superimposed rows. The finishing stone sitting on the capital is decorated with floral patterns and a diagonal design.

=== Jupiter figure ===
The Jupiter figure standing on the column survives only in a few fragments. It can be assumed that during the violent destruction of the Jupiter column, the gilded bronze Jupiter statue was smashed and melted down for its metal value. The over-three-meter-tall, larger-than-life figure was depicted standing or seated, holding a thunderbolt bundle as a typical attribute and with an eagle standing beside him. Preserved are the left foot (clad in a sandal), a finger, a thunderbolt wedge, an eagle's claw, and smaller parts of the body's midsection.

Column drums and Jupiter figure (replica of the Great Mainz Jupiter Column in front of the Saalburg)

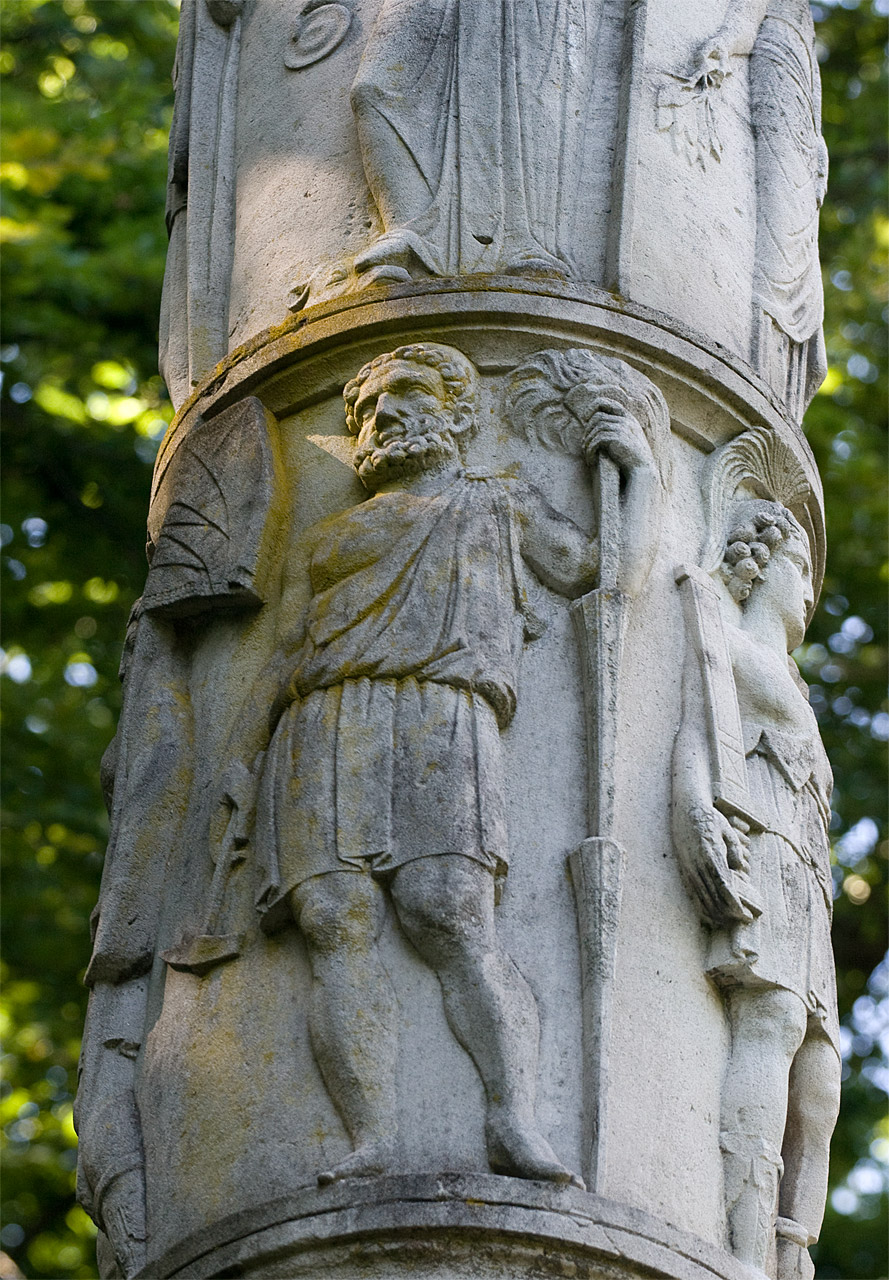
Vulcan

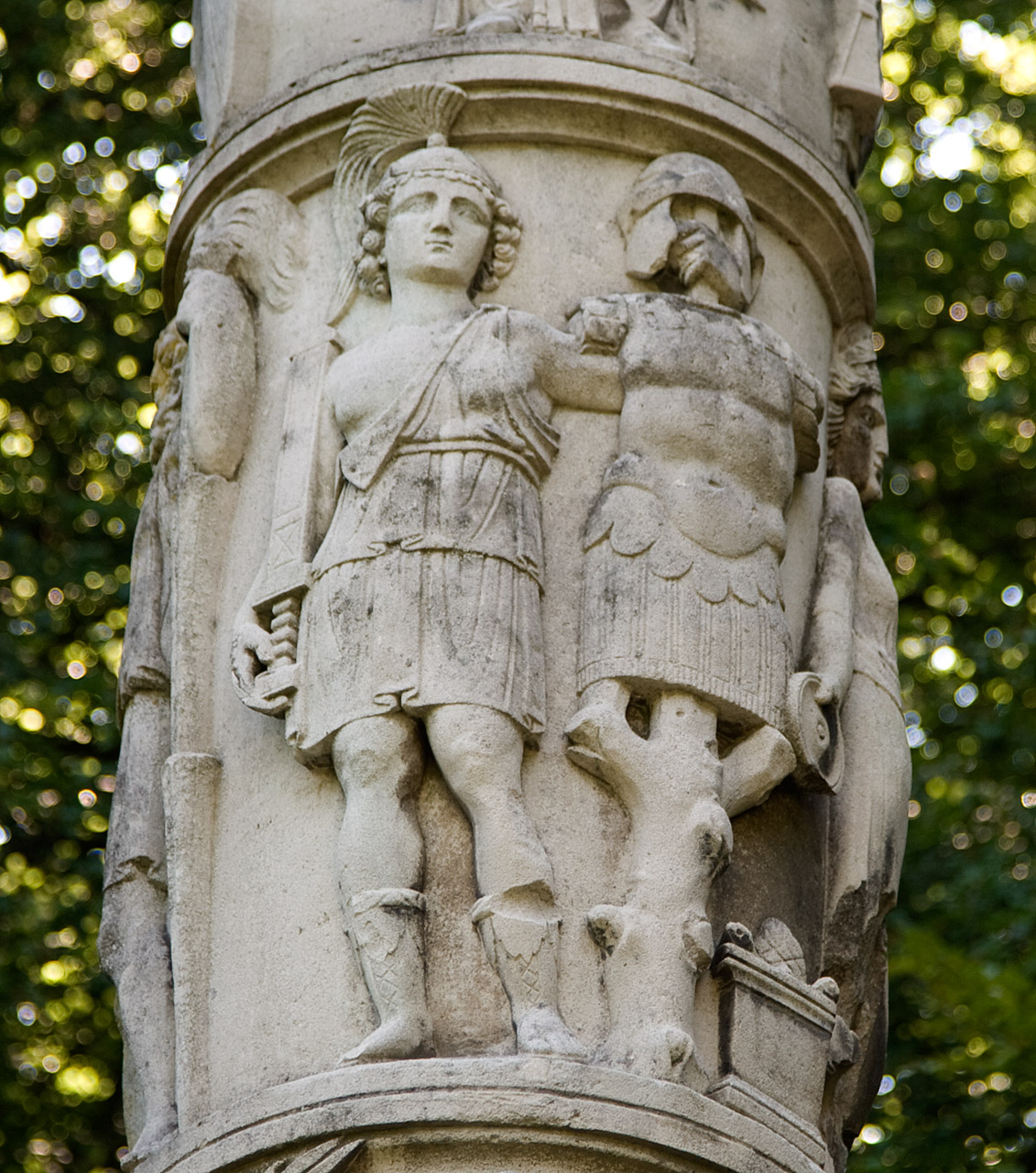
Virtus (?), personification of bravery

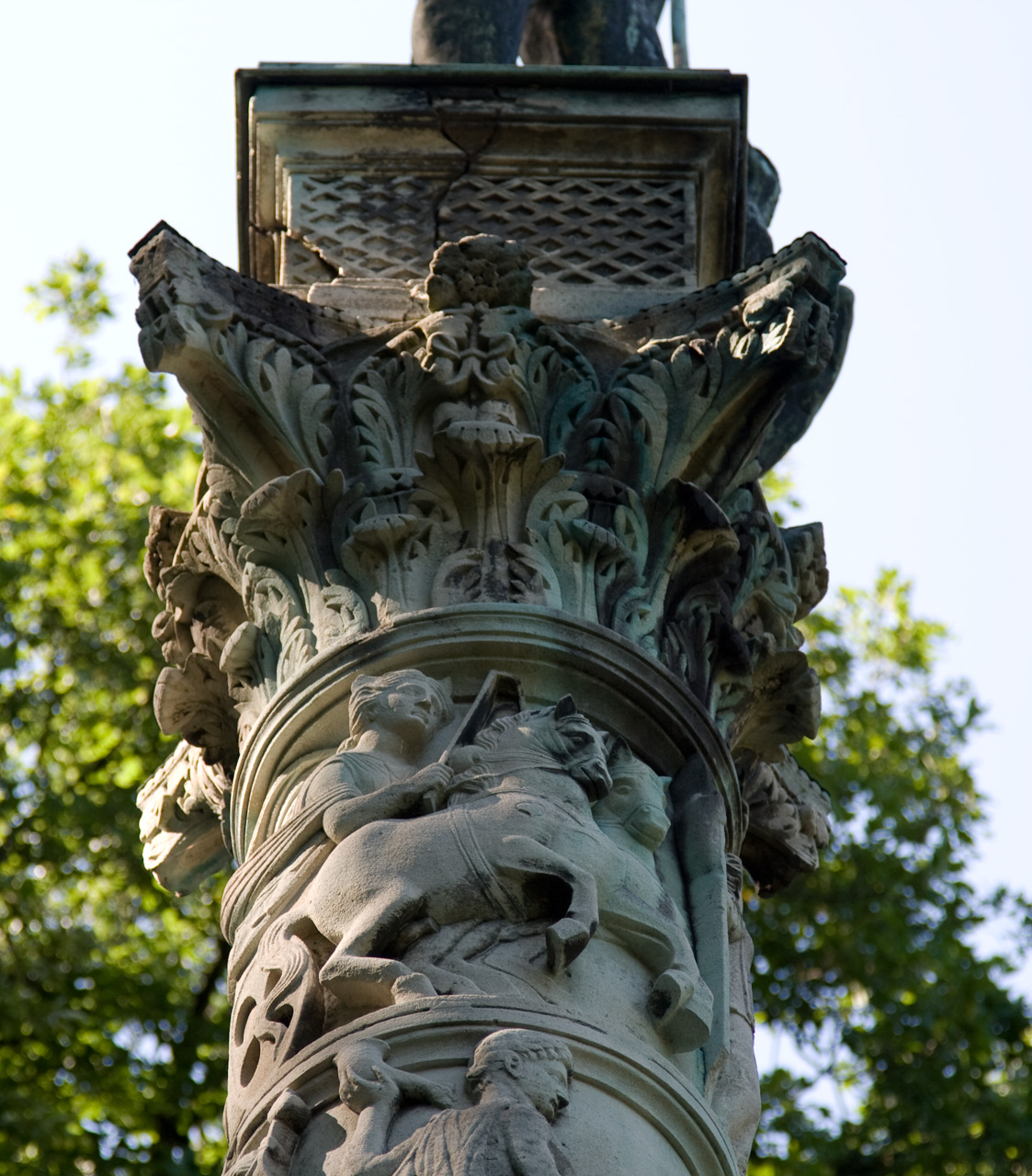
Corinthian capital

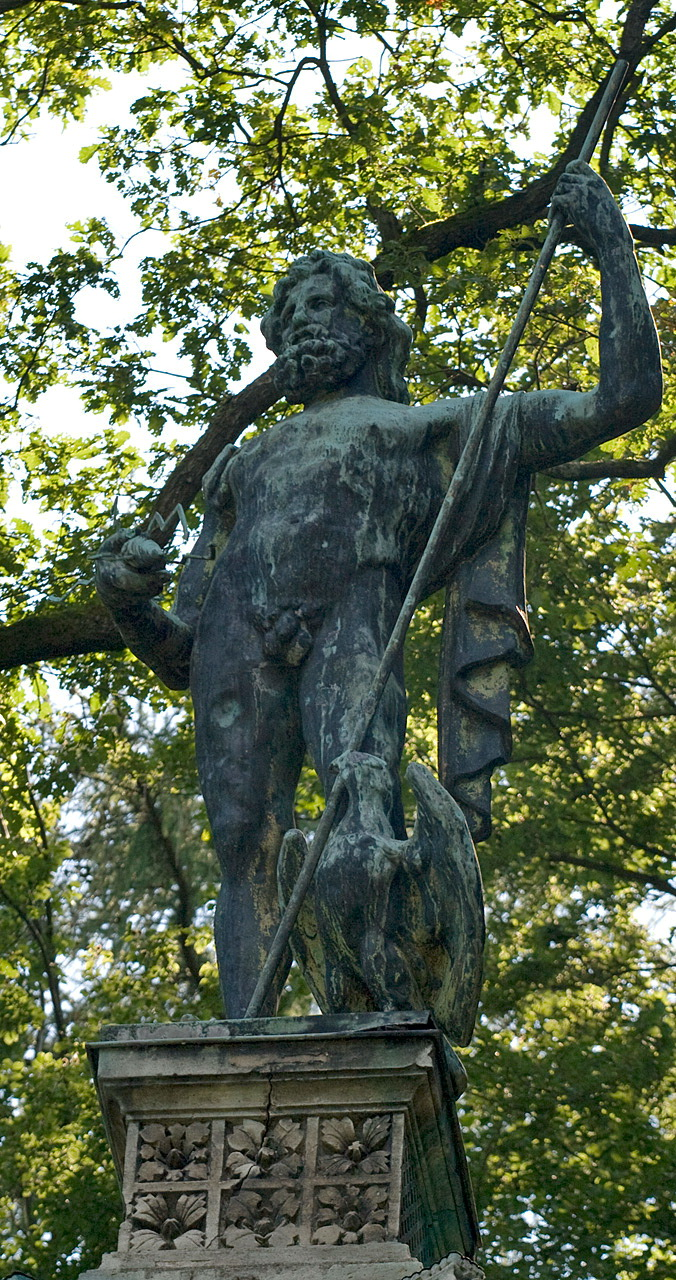
Reconstruction attempt of the Jupiter figure

== Inscriptions ==
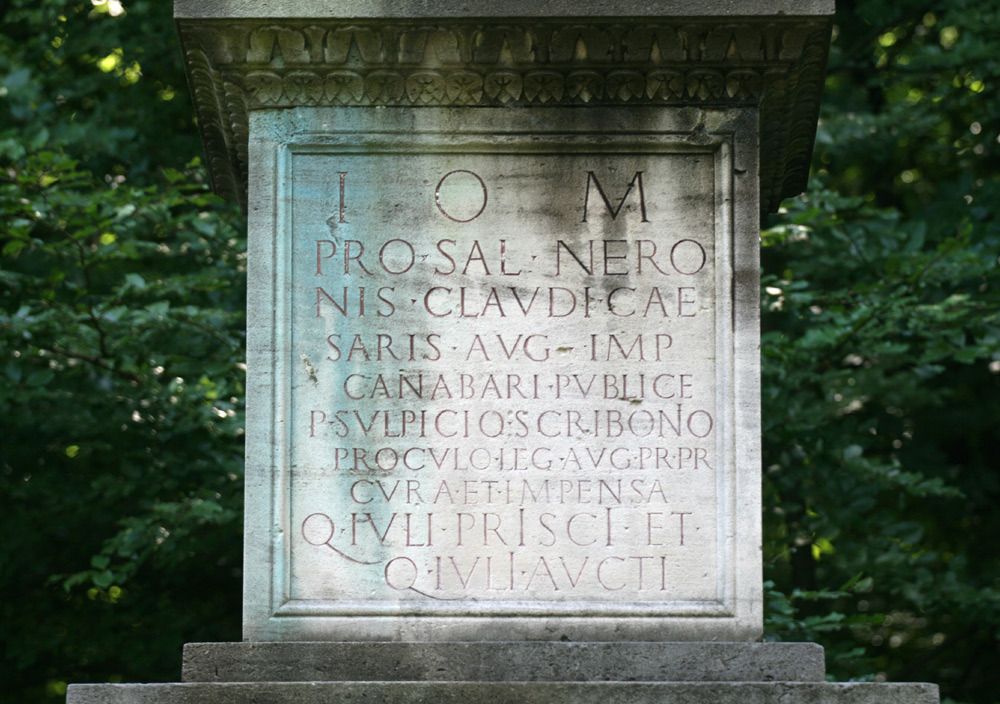
Dedicatory inscription of the Jupiter column (Saalburg replica)

Along with the fragments of the Jupiter column, inscriptions also came to light. A dedicatory inscription is integrated on the front of one of the lower bases. It is repeated in abbreviated form on a sacrificial altar that stood at some distance in front of the Jupiter column and is also preserved. The donors are the canabarii, the civilian population of an unnamed civilian settlement. On their behalf, the two named curatores Quintus Iulius Priscus and Quintus Iulius Auctus dedicated the monument along with the dedicatory altar. The names of the two most likely native Celtic sculptors are also found on one of the lower base stones. The inscription reads: [S]amus et Severus Venicarii f(ilii) sculpserunt. The dedicatory inscription on the front of the intermediate base reads:

Original text	Reading
I(ovi) O(ptimo) M(aximo) PRO [sa]L(ute) [Nero-] [nis] CLAV[d]I CAE- SARIS AV[g](usti) IMP(eratoris) CANABA[rii] PVBLICE P(ublio) SVLPICIO SCRIBONIO PROCVLO LEG[(ato)] AVG(usti) P[r(o) p]R(aetore) CVRA ET IMPENSA Q(uinti) IVLI PRISCI ET Q(uinti) IVLI AVCTI	To Jupiter Optimus Maximus (dedicated) for the safety of Nero Claudius Caesar Augustus Imperator the inhabitants of the Canabae by public act (this monument), when Publius Sulpicius Scribonius Proculus was governor. Execution and expenses were undertaken by Quintus Julius Priscus and Quintus Julius Auctus

After the fall and subsequent suicide of Nero in 68, his person fell victim to a nationwide damnatio memoriae ordered by the Senate. This is also evident in the inscription on the Mainz Jupiter column. In the second and third lines, Nero's name and title were deliberately erased; the words are still decipherable.

== Dating ==
Due to the inscriptions, a relatively precise dating of the Great Mainz Jupiter Column is possible. Publius Sulpicius Scribonius Proculus was legatus of the Upper Germanic army from about 63 to 67, until he was driven to suicide by a political intrigue initiated by Nero himself. The phrasing pro salute Neronis in the dedicatory inscription indicates, as mentioned, a dedication on the occasion of an unsuccessful assassination attempt on Nero or another extraordinary event in Nero's life. Possible events include the murder of Nero's mother, Agrippina the Younger (March 59), or the suppression of the Pisonian conspiracy in April 65. According to the current state of research, the Pisonian conspiracy is favored as the occasion for the dedication of the monument. Following this assumption, the creation of the Jupiter column can be narrowed down relatively precisely to the period 65 to 67.

== Significance ==
The Great Mainz Jupiter Column is one of the most significant monuments of Roman Mainz. At 12.50 meters, it is the largest known monument of this type and, due to its rich relief decoration, also the most elaborately designed Jupiter column. Because of its importance, copies of the Great Mainz Jupiter Column exist in Mainz as well as on the grounds of the Saalburg in Hesse (there with a freely reconstructed Jupiter figure), in the Musée d'Archéologie Nationale in Saint-Germain-en-Laye near Paris, and in the Museo della Civiltà Romana in Rome. The significance of this column lies on one hand in its function as a pioneering prototype for the type of Jupiter columns and Jupiter Great Columns that developed from it. On the other hand, it serves as an example of the formation of a Gallo-Roman artistic and religious understanding in the conquered Germanic provinces, whose relatively rapid emergence can be traced both chronologically and stylistically using the example of the Great Mainz Jupiter Column. Finally, the monument itself allows conclusions about the establishment and development of civilian life in the militarily dominated garrison town of Mogontiacum.

=== Mixture of Roman and Celtic artistic and religious concepts ===
The creation of the Great Mainz Jupiter Column, with its well-defined period of origin, is an important indication that the native population relatively quickly adopted the civilizational achievements and cultural ideas of the Roman occupying power. Thus, the monument features architectural design elements based on Italian models. However, the depicted pantheon already shows the fusion of Roman and Celtic deities as a result of the development of a new religious form of Gallo-Roman character.

=== Model for Jupiter and Jupiter Great Columns ===
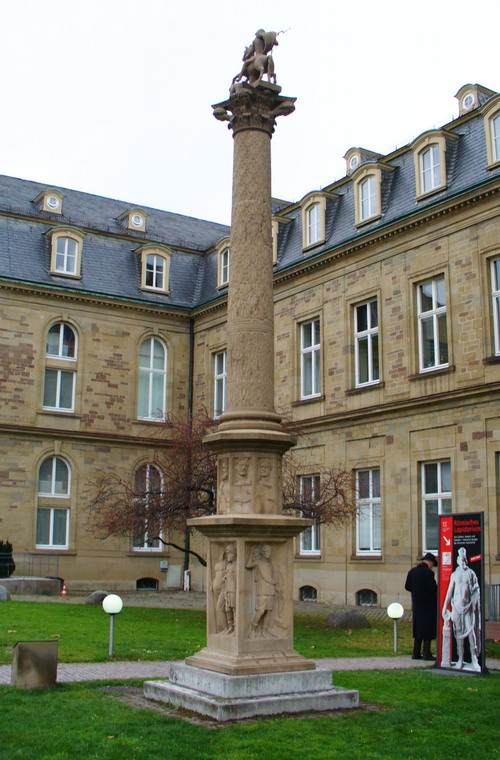
Reconstructed Jupiter Great Column

The Great Mainz Jupiter Column is considered the model and first example of the Jupiter (Great) columns popular in the northwestern Roman Empire until the 3rd century. From the Jupiter column of Mogontiacum developed on one hand the type of Jupiter columns. These resemble the Mainz model more closely in design. On a Viergötterstein and a column often decorated with images, a seated Jupiter usually follows, sometimes together with his wife Juno Regina. A modification of the Jupiter column is the Jupiter Great Column. Here, Jupiter is depicted in the role of the god riding down the Giant, who triumphs over chaos and stands above the other gods and humans. The figure group usually stands on a column scaled like a snake. This type was particularly widespread in the province of Germania Superior. In Mogontiacum and its surroundings alone, remains of up to 76 different (?) Jupiter (Great) columns were found. Jupiter or Jupiter Great columns were generally civilian dedicatory monuments, often erected on private land, for example at villae rusticae. Jupiter columns were particularly the most popular votive monument type in the 2nd and 3rd centuries in the province of Germania Inferior. Archaeologically, both types are among the best-documented monument groups in the two Germanic provinces today.

=== Insights into civilian life in Mogontiacum in the 1st century ===
As a civilian monument donated by citizens of this at most 70-year-old civilian settlement in the area of present-day Mainz Neustadt, which was only one of several canabae, the Great Mainz Jupiter Column indicates an already numerous and prosperous population in 1st-century Roman Mainz. Only this could afford to commission such a representative and costly monument. Possibly, the erection of the Great Mainz Jupiter Column and its dedication as part of a major public act (publice) was also intended to underscore the canabarii's efforts to obtain official city rights for their rising civilian settlement. Moreover, the Jupiter column is the only evidence of Roman provincial art in Mogontiacum whose creators are known in more detail. The two donors are named in the inscription on one of the base stones. In the persons of the two native Celtic brothers Samus and Severus, the artists are known to us thanks to another inscription on the monument. In no other place were so many subsequent dedications of Jupiter columns found as in Mogontiacum. Thus, further Jupiter (Great) columns were found at various locations in the present-day city area of Mainz and its surroundings, for example at the Höfchen, at Gutenbergplatz, in Neustadt, in Mainz-Kastel, as well as an elaborately crafted Jupiter Great Column in Wiesbaden-Schierstein.

== Bibliography ==
- Gerhard Bauchhenß: Die große Iuppitersäule aus Mainz. (= Corpus Signorum Imperii Romani. Corpus der Skulpturen der Römischen Welt. Deutschland (Germania Superior). Band II / Teil 2). Habelt, Bonn 1984, ISBN 3-88467-005-0.
- Gerhard Bauchhenß: Denkmäler des Iuppiterkultes aus Mainz und Umgebung. (= Corpus Signorum Imperii Romani. Corpus der Skulpturen der Römischen Welt. Deutschland (Germania Superior). Band II / Teil 3). Verlag des Römisch-Germanischen Zentralmuseums, Mainz 1984, ISBN 3-88467-006-9.
- Gerhard Bauchhenß: Jupitergigantensäulen. In the Lexicon of Germanic Antiquity Studies (Reallexikon der Germanischen Altertumskunde) (RGA). 2nd edition, Vol. 16, Walter de Gruyter, Berlin/New York 2000, p(p). 132–135.
- Heinz Cüppers (ed.): Die Römer in Rheinland-Pfalz. Nikol Verlag, Hamburg 2005, ISBN 3-933203-60-0.
- Karl-Viktor Decker, Wolfgang Selzer: Mainz von der Zeit des Augustus bis zum Ende der römischen Herrschaft. In: Hildegard Temporini, Wolfgang Haase (eds.): Aufstieg und Niedergang der römischen Welt. Geschichte und Kultur Roms im Spiegel der neueren Forschung. Band II 5, 1, Walter de Gruyter, Berlin 1976, ISBN 3-11-006690-4, pp. 457–559.
- Franz Dumont (ed.), Ferdinand Scherf, Friedrich Schütz: Mainz – Die Geschichte der Stadt. 2nd edition. Philipp von Zabern Verlag, Mainz 1999, ISBN 3-8053-2000-0.
- Hans Ulrich Instinsky: Kaiser Nero und die Mainzer Jupitersäule. In: Jahrbuch des Römisch-Germanischen Zentralmuseums Mainz 6, 1959, pp. 128–141.
- Michael J. Klein (ed.): Die Römer und ihr Erbe. Fortschritt durch Innovation und Integration. Philipp von Zabern, Mainz 2003, ISBN 3-8053-2948-2.
- Wolfgang Selzer, Karl-Victor Decker, Anibal Do Paço: Römische Steindenkmäler. Mainz in römischer Zeit. Philipp von Zabern, Mainz 1988, ISBN 3-8053-0993-7.
- Wolfgang Spickermann: Mogontiacum (Mainz) als politischer und religiöser Zentralort der Germania superior. In: Hubert Cancik, Alfred Schäfer, Wolfgang Spickermann (eds.): Zentralität und Religion. Zur Formierung urbaner Zentren im Imperium Romanum (= Studien und Texte zu Antike und Christentum. Band 39). Mohr Siebeck, Tübingen 2006, ISBN 3-16-149155-6.
- Michael Auras, Ellen Riemer, Karin Schinken, Anna Steyer, Matthias Steyer: Die Große Jupitersäule – von der Computertomografie zum Restaurierungskonzept in: Die Denkmalpflege, issue 1, 2018, pp. 16–24, doi:10.1515/dkp-2018-760105.
- Generaldirektion Kulturelles Erbe Rheinland-Pfalz, Landesmuseum Mainz, Ellen Riemer (eds.): Die große Mainzer Jupitersäule. Archäologie, Geschichte und Restaurierung, Nünnerich-Asmus Verlag, Oppenheim am Rhein, 2022. ISBN 978-3-96176-189-0
