= Esus =

Celtic god

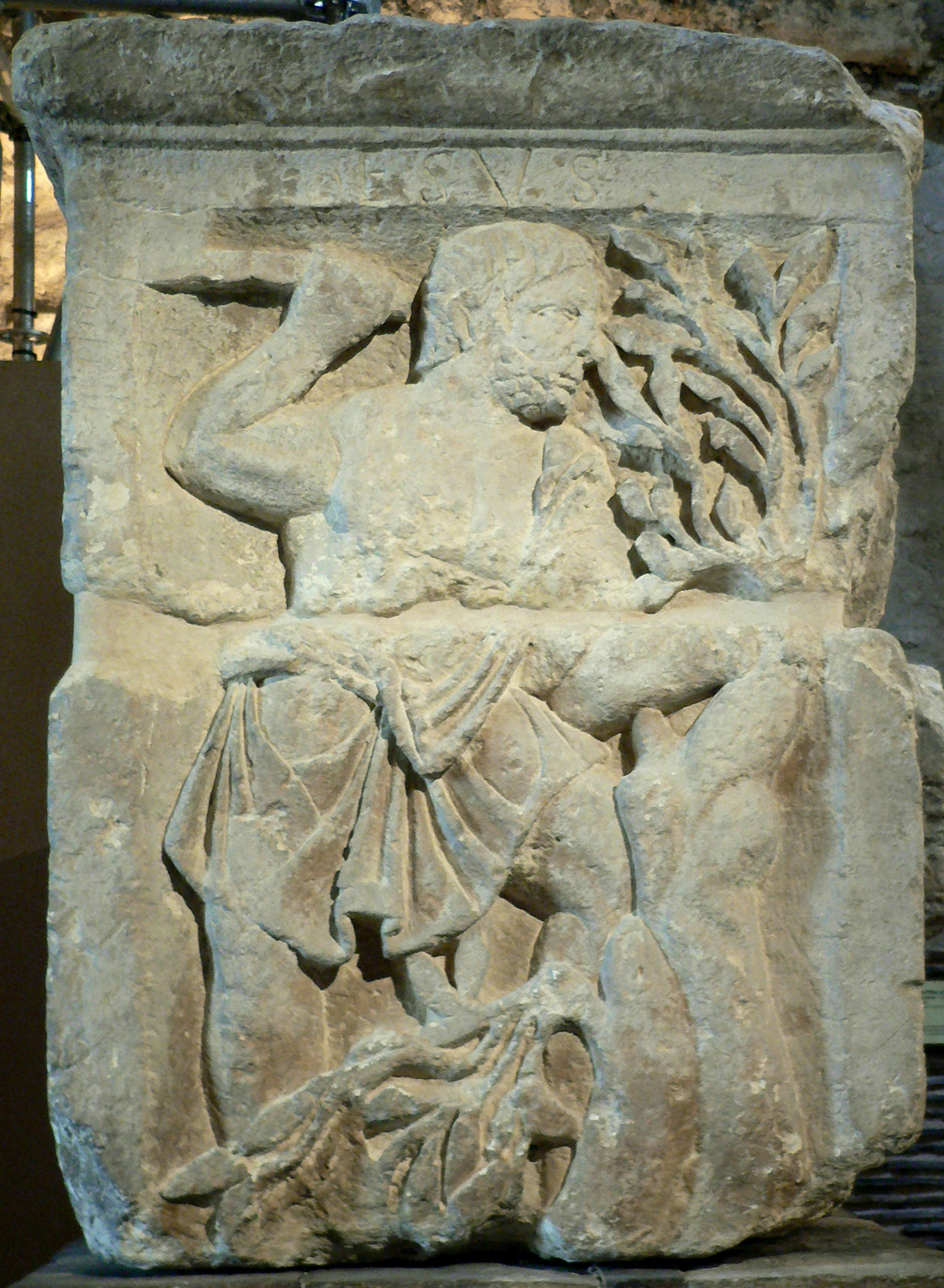
Esus as depicted on the Pillar of the Boatmen

Esus (Note: In ancient sources, variously Aesus, Aisus, Haesus, Hesus. Earlier forms with the stem "-os" are also known.) is a Celtic god known from iconographic, epigraphic, and literary sources.

The 1st-century CE Roman poet Lucan's epic Pharsalia mentions Esus, Taranis, and Teutates as gods to whom the Gauls sacrificed humans. This rare mention of Celtic gods under their native names in a Greco-Roman text has been the subject of much comment. Almost as often commented on are the scholia to Lucan's poem (early medieval, but relying on earlier sources) which tell us the nature of these sacrifices: in particular, that Esus's victims were suspended from a tree and bloodily dismembered. The nature of this ritual is obscure, but it has been compared with a wide range of sources, including Welsh and Germanic mythology, as well as with the violent end of the Lindow Man.

Esus has been connected (through an inscription which identifies him and an allied character, Tarvos Trigaranos, by name) with a pictorial myth on the Pillar of the Boatmen, a Gallo-Roman column from Paris. This myth associates Esus, felling or pruning a tree, with a bull and three cranes. A similar monument to Esus and Tarvos Trigaranos from Trier confirms this association. The nature of this myth is little understood; it at least confirms the scholia's association of Esus with trees.

Esus appears rarely in inscriptions, with only two certain attestations of his name in the epigraphic record. His name appears more commonly as an element of personal names. While Lucan only attributes the worship of Esus to unspecified Gauls, inscriptions place the worship of Esus in Gaul, Noricum, and perhaps Roman North Africa; personal names may also place his worship in Britain. In inscriptions, Esus is attested as early as the 1st century BCE. In Latin literature, he may appear as late as the 5th century CE.

== Etymology ==
A large number of etymologies have been proposed for the name "Esus". The nature of the god's name is not certain. Wolfgang Meid has suggested it may be a euphemism, cover-name, or epithet of the god. Claude Sterckx has even questioned whether "Esus" was a name given to only one deity (though his view is a minority one).

The most widely adopted etymology derives Esus's name from the proto-Indo-European verbal root *h₁eis- ("to be reverent, to worship"), cognate with Italic aisos ("god"). This etymology is supported by the fact that it makes the initial vowel of Esus's name long, which agrees with both Lucan's poetic stress and the variant spellings which use "ae" for this vowel. However, D. Ellis Evans points out that the more common etymology for Italic aisos derives this word from an Etruscan word; since Etruscan is non-Indo-European and Celtic is Indo-European, this would rule out a relationship between Esus and aisos.

Joseph Vendryes linked the name with proto-Indo-European *esu- ("good"). Jan de Vries is sceptical of this, pointing out that this is difficult to reconcile with the fearful god described in Lucan and the scholia. Meid suggests the name would then be a euphemism, comparing it with the Irish god-name Dagda ("the good god"). Henri d'Arbois de Jubainville linked it to proto-Indo-European *is- ("to wish"). T. F. O'Rahilly linked it to proto-Indo-European *eis- ("vital force, life"). Félix Guirand suggested the name was cognate with Latin erus ("lord", "master"), which Meid notes is a common epiclesis given to deities (Freyr, Ba'al). Other etymologies have variously connected the name with German Ehre ("honour"), Ancient Greek αἰδέομαι (aidéomai, "to be ashamed"), Old Norse eir ("brass, copper"), and Breton heuzuz ("terrible").

== Lucan and the scholia ==
=== Lucan ===
Lucan's Pharsalia or De Bello Civili (On the Civil War) is an epic poem, begun about 61 CE, on the events of Caesar's civil war (49–48 BCE). The passage relevant to Esus occurs in "Gallic excursus", an epic catalogue detailing the rejoicing of the various Gaulish peoples after Julius Caesar removed his legions from Gaul (where they were intended to control the natives) to Italy. The passage thus brings out two themes of Lucan's work, the barbarity of the Gauls and the unpatriotism of Caesar.

Tu quoque laetatus converti proelia, Trevir,
Et nunc tonse Ligur, quondam per colla decore
Crinibus effusis toti praelate Comatae;
Et quibus inmitis placatur sanguine diro
Teutates horrensque feris altaribus Esus
Et Taranis Scythicae non mitior ara Dianae.

Translation:

Transferral of the warfare pleased you too, Treviri,
and you, Ligures, now shorn of hair but once in all of Long-Haired
Gaul unrivalled for your tresses flowing gracefully over your necks;
and the people who with grim blood-offering placate
Teutates the merciless and Esus dread with savage altars
and the slab of Taranis, no kinder than Diana of the Scythians.

The substance of the last few lines is this: unspecified Gauls, who made human sacrifices to their gods Teutates, Esus, and Taranis, were overjoyed by the exit of Caesar's troops from their territory. The reference to "Diana of the Scythians" refers to the human sacrifices demanded by Diana at her temple in Scythian Taurica, well known in antiquity. That Lucan says little about these gods is not surprising. Lucan's aims were poetic, and not historical or ethnographic. The poet never travelled to Gaul and relied on secondary sources for his knowledge of Gaulish religion. When he neglects to add more, this may well reflect the limits of his knowledge.

We have no literary sources prior to Lucan which mention these deities, and the few which mention them after Lucan (in the case of Esus, Lactantius and Petronius) seem to borrow directly from this passage. The secondary sources on Celtic religion which Lucan relied on in this passage (perhaps Posidonius) have not come down to us, so it is hard to date or contextualise his information. This passage is one of the very few in classical literature in which Celtic gods are mentioned under their native names, (Note: For the most part, classical sources describe Celtic gods under Greek or Roman names without further comment. Georg Wissowa emphasises that Lucan "stands almost alone" (steht nahezu allein) apart from this tradition. Epona, the Gallo-Roman horse god, is a notable exception; she appears frequently in classical literature, and never under an interpretatio. Other Celtic gods mentioned under their own name in later literature include Belenus, Ogmios, Grannus, and Andraste.) rather than identified with Greek or Roman gods. This departure from classical practice likely had poetic intent: emphasising the barbarity and exoticness the Gauls, whom Caesar had left to their own devices.

Some scholars, such as de Vries, have argued that the three gods mentioned together here (Esus, Teutates, and Taranis) formed a divine triad in ancient Gaulish religion. However, there is little other evidence associating these gods with each other. Other scholars, such as Graham Webster, emphasise that Lucan may as well have chosen these deity-names for their poetic stress and harsh sound.

=== Scholia ===
Lucan's Pharsalia was a very popular school text in late antiquity and the medieval period. This created a demand for commentaries and scholia (explanatory notes) dealing with difficulties in the work, both in grammar and subject matter. The earliest Lucan scholia that have come down to us are the Commenta Bernensia and Adnotationes Super Lucanum, both from manuscripts datable between the 9th and 11th centuries. In spite of their late date, the Commenta and Adnotationes are thought to incorporate very ancient material, some of it now lost; both are known to contain material at least as old as Servius the Grammarian (4th century CE). Also interesting, though less credible, are comments from a Cologne codex (the Glossen ad Lucan), dating to the 11th and 12th centuries. Below are excerpts from these scholia relevant to Esus:

Commentary	Latin	English
Commenta Bernensia ad Lucan, 1.445	Hesus Mars sic placatur: homo in arbore suspenditur usque donec per cruorem membra digesserit.	Hesus Mars is appeased in this way: a man is suspended from a tree until his limbs are divided as a result of the bloodshed (?).
Commenta Bernensia ad Lucan, 1.445	item aliter exinde in aliis invenimus. [...] Hesum Mercurium credunt, si quidem a mercatoribus colitur	We also find it [depicted] differently by other [authors]. [...] They believe Hesus to be Mercury, because he is worshipped by the merchants
Adnotationes super Lucanum, 1.445.	Esus Mars sic dictus a Gallis, qui hominum cruore placatur.	Esus is the name given by the Gauls to Mars, who is appeased with human blood.
Glossen ad Lucan, 1.445	Esus id est Mars.	Esus, that is Mars.

The first excerpt, about the sacrifice to Esus, comes from a passage in the Commenta which details the human sacrifices offered to each of the three gods (persons were drowned in a barrel for Teutates, persons were burned in a wooden tub for Taranis). This passage, which is not paralleled anywhere else in classical literature, has been the subject of much commentary. It seems to have been preserved in the Commenta by virtue of its author's preference for factual (over grammatical) explanation. The Adnotationes, by comparison, tell us nothing about the sacrifices to Esus, Teutates, and Taranis beyond that they were each murderous. The nature of the sacrifice to Esus described here is unclear; the Latin text is cramped and ambiguous. Early Celticists relied on drastic emendations to the text, which have not been sustained in later scholarship. (Note: Victor Tourneur (1902) called the text "untranslatable" (intraduisible). He proposed to emend the bizarre per cruorem ("as a result of bloodshed") to percussor ("murderer, sacrificer") and to regard membra digesserit as a poetic description, not literally referring to a separation of limbs. He thus arrived at the translation: "A man is hung on a tree until the sacrificer has killed him". Albert Bayet (1925) and Camille Jullian (1926) followed Tourneur's emendation of per cruorem. Jullian went further to propose that digesserit was a corruption of disiecerit ("severed").) To give a few difficulties: digesserit here could refer to a process of decomposition or a violent severing of the limbs; cruor means "blood" and "raw meat", but also metaphorically "murder"; and in arbore suspenditur, often read as suggesting that Esus's victims were hanged by the neck from a tree, is perhaps nearer in meaning to saying that his victims were "fixed to" or "suspended from a tree".

As a result of this ambiguity, a very large number of interpretations of the sacrificial ritual to Esus have been given. It has been pointed out that hanging by the neck does not result in loss of blood; and that neither of these lead to a dislocation of the limbs. Suggestions include that the victim was tied to the tree in order to be dismembered; or dismembered by means of tree branches; or injured and then suspended from the tree, by their armpits or limbs. This ritual has been compared with various legendary demises: the human sacrifices to Odin, (Note: Germanic mythology has it that Odin obtained knowledge of the runes by piercing himself with a javelin and suspending himself from a tree for nine days. This sacrifice was imitated by his devotees: King Wikar is thus sacrificed to Odin in Gautreks saga; as are another king's nine sons in Ynglinga saga; and Adam of Bremen tells us that men were hung from trees in the grove of the Temple at Uppsala. Stefan Czarnowski drew a parallel between these sacrifices and the sacrifice to Odin, suggesting that the "bloodshed" was a result of the injury by javelin. Françoise Le Roux notes, as support for a relationship between the two rituals, that ritual hanging is almost unknown among the Celts, but very common within the cult of Odin.) the death of the mythological Welsh hero Lleu Llaw Gyffes, and the martyrdom of St Marcel de Chalon. (Note: Émile Thévenot connected the ritual with the unusual torture of St Marcel de Chalon (d. 177/179) in an early medieval hagiography: after refusing to worship before Mars, Mercury, and Minerva, the pagans tied the saint to two branches of a tree, forced together, which sprung back and detached the saints' limbs from his body. Thévenot suggested the hagiographer of St Marcel and scholiast of the Commenta drew from the same source for this pagan ritual. Waldemar Deonna and Paul-Marie Duval are unconvinced by this parallel. Both argue that Thévenot's comparison does violence to the description in the Commenta, and Deonna points out that the elements of this martyrdom are not unknown in other hagiographies.) The violent end of the bog body known as the Lindow Man—throat slashed, strangled, bludgeoned, and drowned—has even been connected with this sacrificial ritual.

All three commentaries offer an interpretatio romana (i.e., the identification of a foreign god with a Roman god) which identifies Esus as Mars (Roman god of war). The scholiast of the Commenta, however, notes that other sources give an interpretatio of Esus as Mercury, (Note: The Commenta offers two sets of interpretatios of the three Celtic gods mentioned in Lucan. In the first set, Teutates is Mercury, Esus is Mars, and Taranis is Dis Pater. In the second set, Teutates is Mars, Esus is Mercury, and Taranis is Jupiter.) for which they offer a rationale: Esus, like Mercury, was worshipped by merchants. It is not possible to demonstrate the authenticity of either of these equations, as we have no source outside these commentaries which pairs the name of Esus with that of a Roman god. The evident confusion of the sources the scholiast had available to him has been taken to count against the evidentiary value of either of these interpretatios. Max Ihm regards the equation of Esus with Mercury as unlikely, because the Trier monument depicts Esus and Mercury next to each other, as separate divinities. On the other hand, a Mercury statue from Lezoux was once conjectured to have a dedicatory inscription to Esus on its rear, which may count in favour of the existence of such an interpretatio.

== Iconography ==
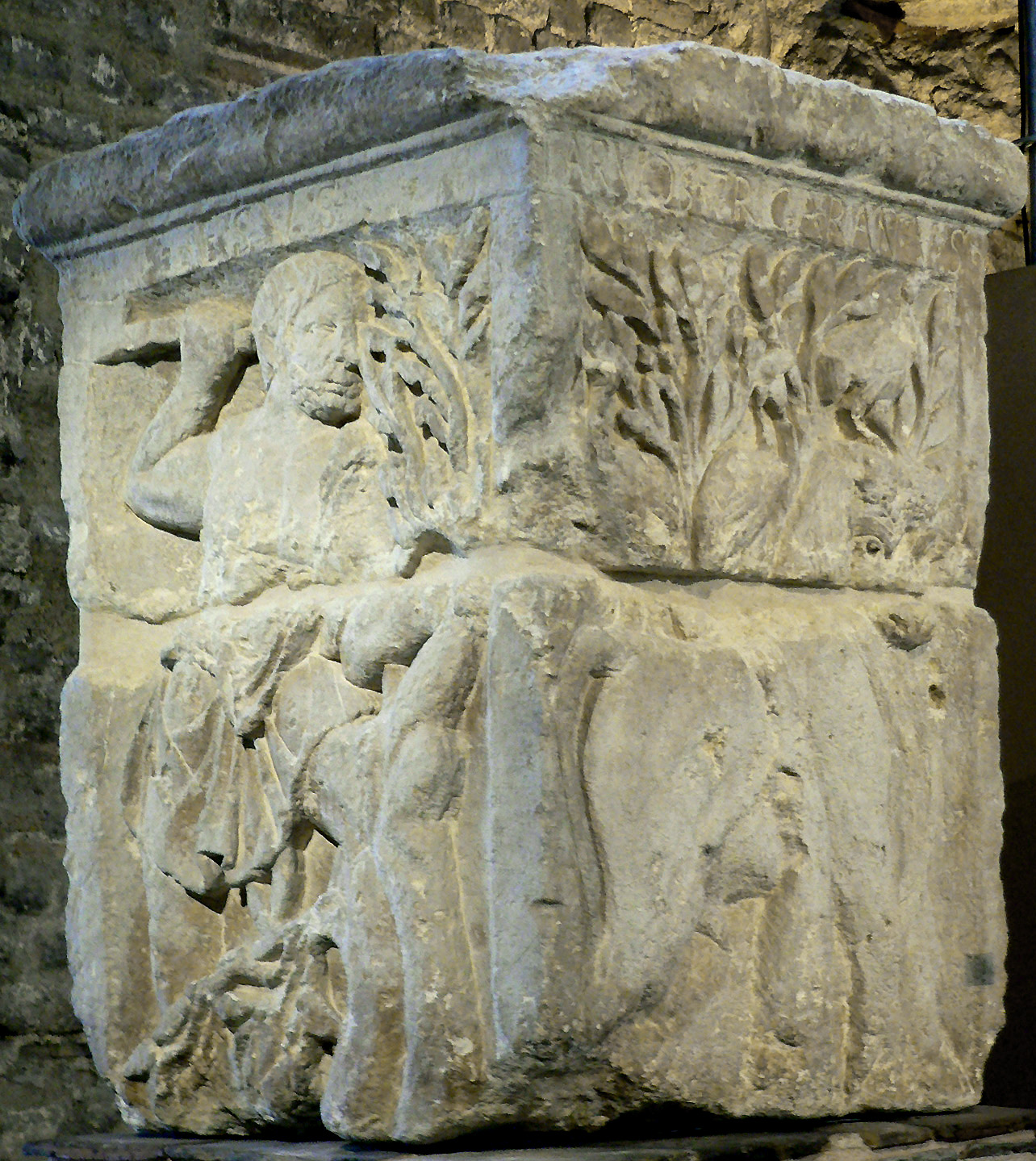
Esus and Tarvos on the Pillar of the Boatmen

The Pillar of the Boatmen is a Roman column erected in Lutetia (Roman Paris) in the time of Tiberius (i.e., 14–37 CE) by a company of sailors. It contains a number of depictions of Roman and Gaulish gods with legends identifying them. On one block of this pillar is an image identified as Esus (alongside Tarvos Trigaranus, and the Roman gods Jupiter and Vulcan). The image is of a bearded man in a tunic with a billhook in his left hand; he is aiming at a tree which he grasps with his right hand. The panel carrying the legend "Tarvos Trigaranus" (literally, "Bull with three cranes") has foliage which continues over from Esus's panel; it depicts a bull with two birds on its back and one between its horns.

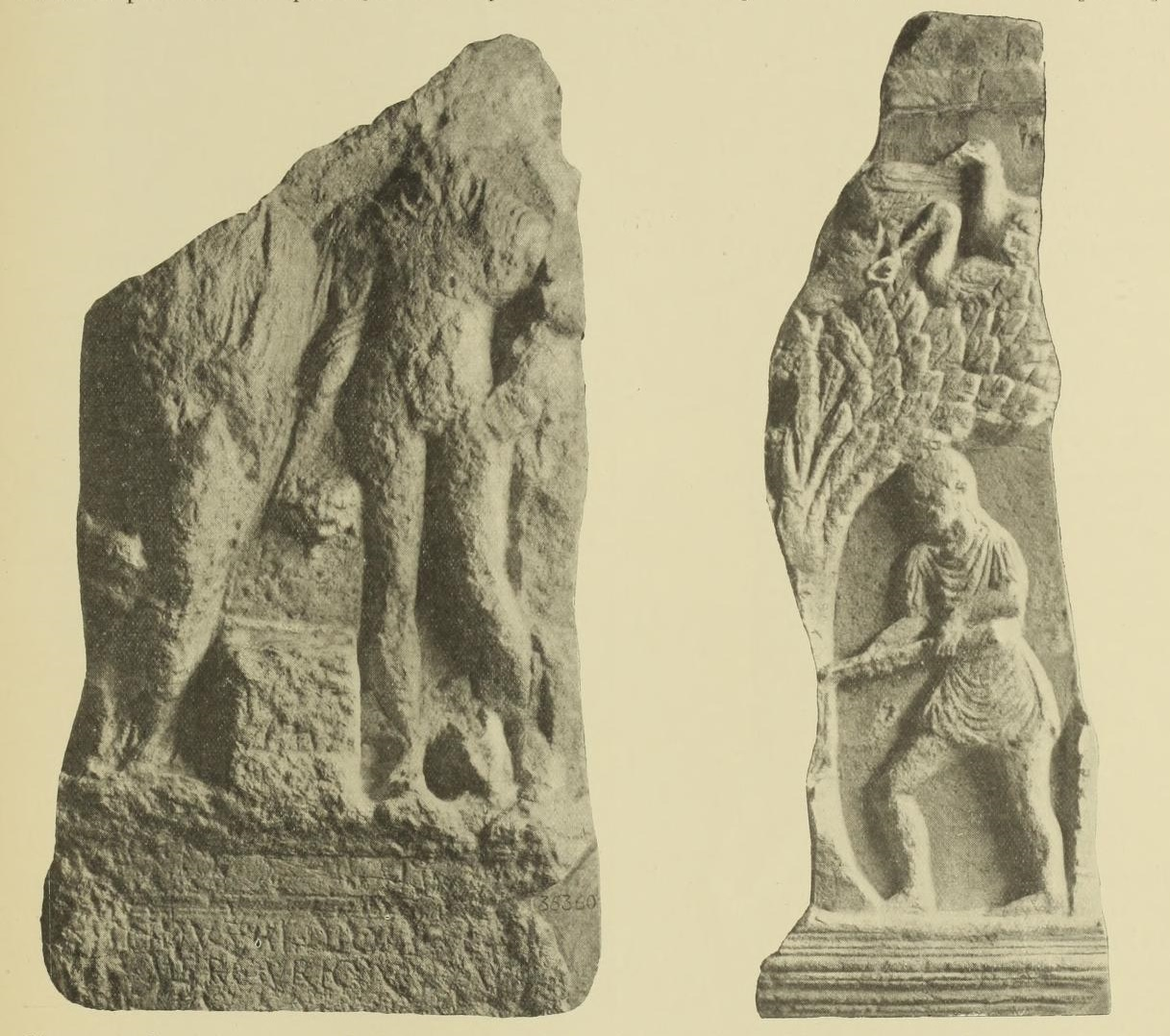
The Trier monument: Left, Mercury and Rosmerta; Right, Esus chopping a tree, which holds a bull and three birds.

A monument from Trier shows an arrangement very similar to the Paris monument. This monument, dedicated to Mercury by one Indus of the Mediomatrici, (Note: CIL XIII, 3656: [I]ndus Mediom(atricus) / Mercurio v(otum) [l(ibens)] m(erito) s(olvit).) is a four-sided block with depictions of gods, much like the Paris monument. On one side is a depiction of Mercury and Rosmerta. On another side, a beardless man in a tunic strikes at a tree; within the tree's foliage, a bull's head and three birds are visible. The similarity of iconography allow the beardless man to be identified with Esus. The monument has been dated to the early imperial period.

These two monuments reveal a pictorial myth about Esus, involving a tree, a bull, and three cranes. The nature of this myth is unknown, but has given rise to much "imaginative speculation". It is not clear whether Esus is engaged in felling or pruning the tree. The cultic significance which the Gauls attached to bulls is well attested, and Anne Ross has argued that there was such a significance associated with cranes as well. De Vries conjectured that the panels represented a sacred enthronement ritual, with the felling of a sacred tree and slaughter of a bull. Henri d'Arbois de Jubainville connected these scenes with events in the mythology of the Irish warrior hero Cú Chulainn, however James MacKillop cautions that this suggestion "now seems ill-founded".

Esus's iconography confirms the importance of trees to his cult, otherwise suggested by the Lucan scholia. Émile Thévenot suggested that the tree Esus chops down on these monuments is the sacrificial tree. Françoise Le Roux suggested that the dendolatry (tree worship) of Esus's cult may reflect the influence of Germanic religion (specifically the cult of Odin).

Jean-Jacques Hatt has identified eight other images as of Esus. Marcel Le Glay (writing for the Lexicon Iconographicum Mythologiae Classicae) dismisses these identifications as "uncertain" and "very random".

== Other attestations ==
=== Geographic distribution ===
Lucan is not clear about which Gauls worshipped Esus, Taranis, and Teutates. Early Celticists, forced to conjecture about the geographic extent of their worship, gave hypotheses ranging from pan-Celtic (Camille Jullian) to "between the Seine and the Loire" (Salomon Reinach). The epigraphic evidence places Esus in Gaul and Noricum, and perhaps also Roman North Africa. Evidence for the worship of Esus in Britain may be provided by a small number of proper names, which perhaps incorporate the god's name (such as the place-name Aesica).

=== Epigraphy ===
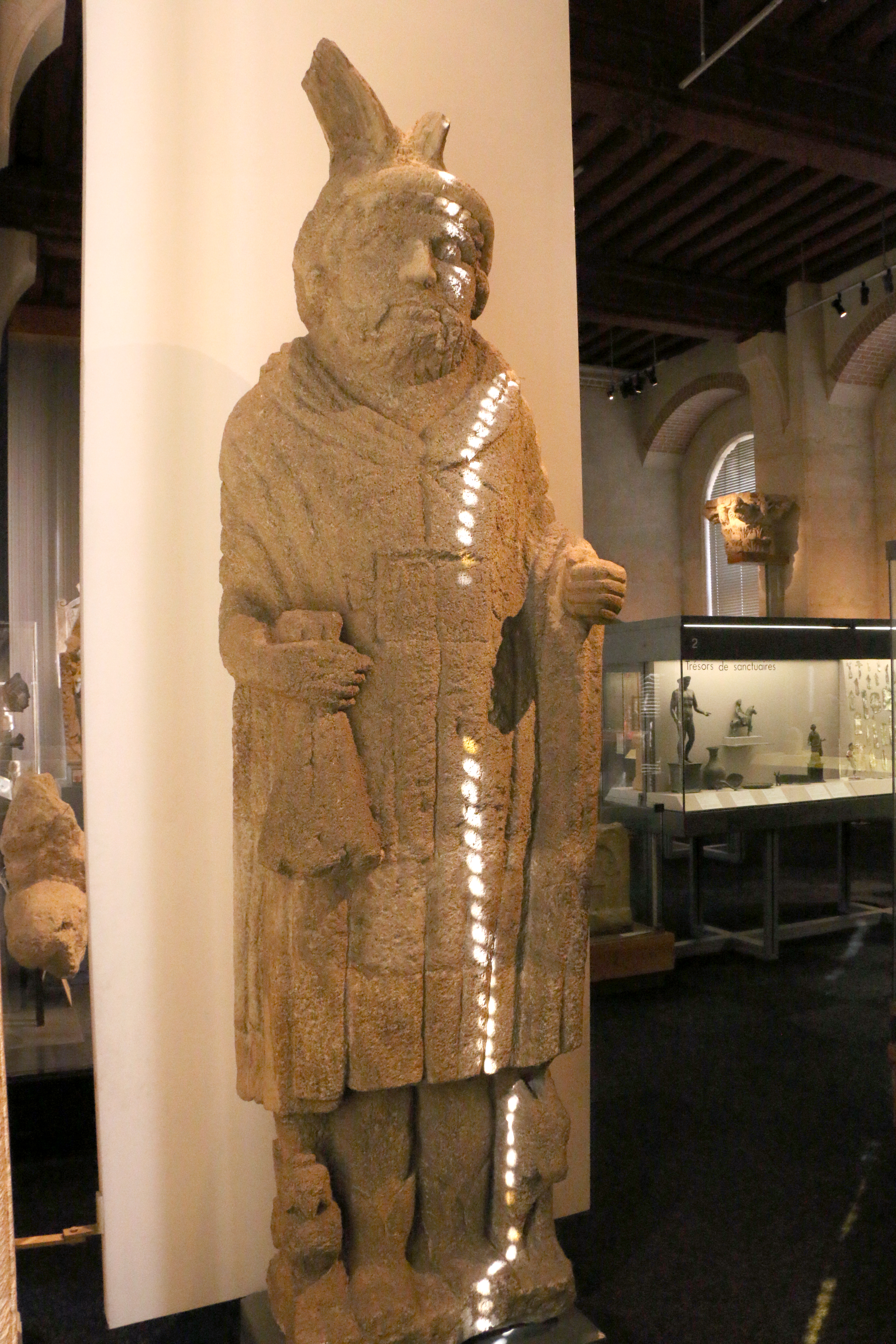
Statue of Mercury from Lezoux

The epigraphic evidence for Esus is very limited. There are only two certain attestations of his name in epigraphy and a handful of conjectured ones. Philippe Leveau and Bernard Remy have suggested that this paucity of evidence may be explained by a Roman suppression of the cult of Esus, on the basis of its purported sacrificial practices.

The first of the two certain inscriptions to Esus is on the Pillar of the Boatmen, below the image of the god. The second was found in 1987 by a metal detectorist, inscribed on a bronze statuette base (Note: AE 1997, 1210: Adginnos / Vercombogi / {A}Eso v(otum) s(olvit) l(ibens) m(erito). For more about this inscription, see Piccottini, Gernot (1996). "Aesus". Carinthia I. 186: 97–103. = Piccottini, Gernot (2002). "Eine neue Esus-lnschrift aus Kärnten". In Zemmer-Plank, L. (ed.). Kult der Vorzeit in den Alpen. Bolzano. pp. 1285–1294.) (the statuette missing). The base was found in Gurina (part of Roman Noricum, now Austria), where there was once a Gallo-Roman religious centre. It is a votive offering to Esus (spelled Aeso, dative of Aesos) made by an individual with a Celtic name. It dates to the end of the 1st century BCE, which makes it the earliest attestation of the god Esus.

An inscription on a fragment of a stele (Note: AE 1985, 934: Peregrinus V[...] / quod Esus fuit iuben[s.) from the necropolis of Caesarea in Mauretania, a Roman city in Algeria, appears to record a votive inscription to Esus from one Peregrinus. The intervention of a Gaulish god in Africa is surprising, and the incomplete preservation of the inscription frustrates interpretation. Andreas Hofeneder withholds judgement as to whether it is an attestation of the Gaulish god. Leveau and Remy dedicate a study to this inscription, in which they date it to the first half of the 1st century CE and consider the possibility that Peregrinus was a Gaulish soldier in North Africa.

Two further inscriptions have been conjectured to mention Esus. The well-known statue of Mercury from Lezoux has a badly weathered inscription on its rear. (Note: CIL XIII, 1514 = RIG II.1 L-8) The text has received several different readings. Michel Lejeune will only allow a[...] / ie[...] / eso[...] to be read. John Rhŷs proposed to read Gaulish Apronios / ieuru sosi / Esu ("Apronios dedicated this object to Esus"). This reading has been the subject of repeated doubt and was later abandoned by Rhŷs himself. Another Gaulish inscription, on a terrine found near Lezoux, (Note: RIG II.2 L-67:) has an unclear initial word which Oswald Szemerényi proposed to read Esus. Pierre-Yves Lambert and Lejeune prefer eso ("this").

=== As an element of proper names ===
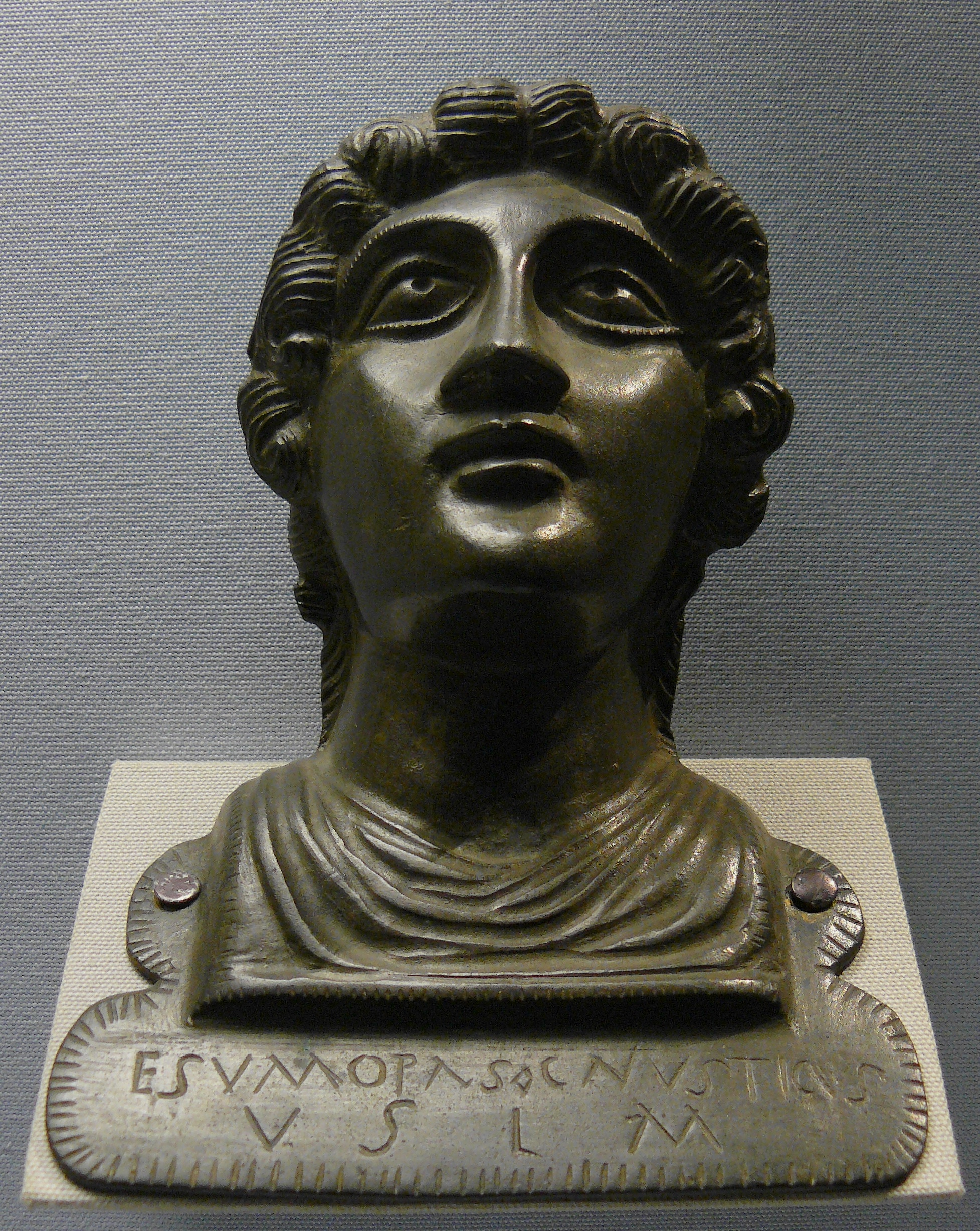
A votive bust dedicated by a man with the name "Esumopas Cnusticus"

Esus's name features as an element of some Celtic personal names (indeed, it is more common in personal names than in inscriptions). Karl Horst Schmidt lists Esugenus (Note: CIL XIII, 4674, also on a coin legend in Holder, Alt-celtischer Sprachschatz I, p. 1475.) ("Fathered by Esus"), Esumagius (Note: CIL XIII, 3071.) ("Powerful through Esus"), Esumopas (Note: CIL XIII, 3199.) ("Slave to Esus"), and Esunertus (Note: CIL XII, 2623, CIL VII, 1334,61, CIL XIII, 11644.) ("Having the power of Esus"). Other personal names connected with Esus include Aesugesli, (Note: AE 2003, 1218) Esullus, and (on a British coin) Æsus. Bernhard Maier is sceptical that the god's name is part of the etymologies of all of these names.

Other Celtic names perhaps incorporating Esus include the tribe-name Esuvii (perhaps "sons of Esus", from Sées); the river-name Esino (in Italy); and the place-names Aesica (in Northumberland), Aeso (in Hispania Tarraconensis), and Essé (in Brittany).

=== Literary sources ===
The Roman author Petronius names a minor character "Hesus" in his picaresque Latin novel Satyricon (c. 54–68 CE). There is nothing in what we know of Petronius that suggests he could have known about Gaulish religion first-hand. If this is a reference to the god Esus, it is probably (as Jean Gricourt suggests) Petronius using Lucan's text to make an obscure joke about the nature of this character.

Lactantius's Christian apologia The Divine Institutes (c. 303-311 CE), in discussing human sacrifice among the pagans, very briefly mentions Esus and Teutates as pagan gods to whom the Gauls sacrificed humans. It is almost universally agreed that Lactantius borrows from Lucan here. He is known to have read Lucan's poem, and Lactantius's testimony does not go beyond Lucan's.

The Gaulish medical writer Marcellus of Bordeaux may offer a textual reference to Esus not dependent on Lucan in his De medicamentis, a compendium of pharmacological preparations written in Latin in the early 5th century which is the sole source for several Celtic words. The work contains a magico-medical charm, which Gustav Must and Léon Fleuriot proposed was a Gaulish language invocation of the aid of Esus (spelled Aisus) in curing throat trouble. The text, however, is quite corrupt and the number of possible interpretations of it have led Alderik H. Blom and Andreas Hofeneder to doubt that the god Esus is referenced here.
