= Rosmerta =

Ancient Celtic goddess of abundance

Rosmerta (Gaulish for 'the great provider') was an ancient Celtic goddess worshipped in eastern Gaul and the Rhineland, generally understood as a goddess of abundance and prosperity. She is attested chiefly as the consort of the Roman Mercury under the interpretatio romana, and appears with him in a large group of Latin dedications and reliefs, though a minority of dedications name her alone. Her attributes are those of abundance, among them the cornucopia, the patera, the purse and a wooden bucket or tub. No classical author names her, the evidence for the goddess being epigraphic and iconographic, together with a single inscription in the Gaulish language.

== Name ==
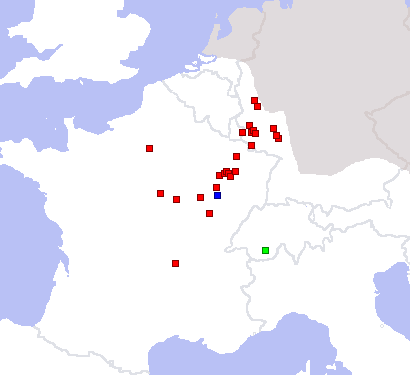
Map showing the location of inscriptions dedicated to Rosmerta (in red), as well as to Cantismerta (green) and Atesmerta (blue).

The goddess's name is recorded in Latin votive inscriptions from Gaul, the Germanies and beyond, where it appears as Rosmerta and, most often, as dea Rosmerta ('the goddess Rosmerta') in dedications shared with Mercury. It also occurs once in the Gaulish language, on a potsherd from Lezoux (Puy-de-Dôme) which reads e[so] ieuri rigani rosmertiac. The theonym is not attested in classical literature.

The name is a Gaulish compound. Its first element is the prefix ro- ('very, great'), from an earlier *pro-, which forms augmentative names in Gaulish. The second is the stem smert-, usually understood in the sense 'provision' or 'provider', so that the whole is generally rendered 'the great provider'. This stem is common in the onomastics of Gaul, above all in divine names, among them Adsmerius, Atesmerta, Cantismerta and the theonym Smertrios, an epithet of Mars, as well as in the northern British tribal name Smertae. Mercury himself bears a surname of the same root, Adsmerius, in a dedication from Poitiers.

The precise sense of smert- has been debated. John T. Koch lists a range of proposed meanings for the element, 'provisioning', 'foresight', 'brilliance' or 'anointed, smeared'. Joseph Vendryes derived it from a root *smer- ('to think about, to take care of', also 'to obtain by lot'), which he connected with the idea of fate, comparing the Greek moira ('destiny'). Xavier Delamarre follows the same root in the sense 'to take care of, to provide', and notes as a Brittonic cognate the Welsh darmerth ('provision, preparation'). Bernhard Maier takes the name to refer to a protective function attributed to the goddess. Paul-Marie Duval and Jan de Vries both settled on the gloss 'the great provider', de Vries adding that name may point to a deity of wealth and, probably, of fertility.

== Cult ==
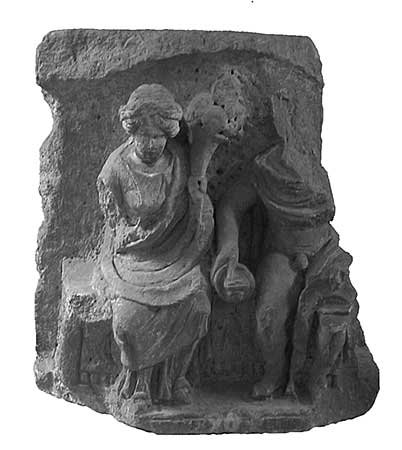
Relief from Autun depicting Rosmerta and Mercury.

Rosmerta is attested chiefly in eastern and north-eastern Gaul and in the Germanies. De Vries found her cult concentrated among the Lingones, the Treveri, the Mediomatrici and the Leuci, which he regarded as the heartland of Gaul, and on this basis treated the cult as a genuinely Gaulish one. Dedications also come from the Aedui in the west and from the Rhineland civitates of Germania Superior, and isolated attestations reach Noricum and, at Sarmizegetusa, the province of Dacia. In the great majority of the inscriptions she is paired with Mercury, whose principal role in Gaul and the Germanies was as a god of commerce, so that the pair suited the running of trade and estates. The dedicants include magistrates, town councillors and seviri Augustales, among them the Treveran brothers Aprossus and Acceptus of the Doccius family, who set up dedications in the temple at Niederemmel.

Where she is shown in relief, Rosmerta carries the emblems of plenty. She holds a cornucopia, a basket of fruit, a patera or a purse, in the manner of a mother goddess, and she sometimes carries a caduceus, the herald's staff of Mercury. On a relief from Glanum in southern Gaul she accompanies a Mercury equipped with his usual attributes and bears a cornucopia. On a relief from Bierstadt near Wiesbaden both figures hold a caduceus, and the accompanying Mercury is named Nundinator ('the trader'), which de Vries took as a mark of the closeness of the pair. She is sometimes associated with, or assimilated to, the Roman Fortuna and may take over that goddess's attributes, such as the rudder and globe.

For most of these reliefs the identification rests on the attributes and on the pairing with Mercury, since only a few carry an inscription that names the goddess. On a cippus from Eisenberg the divine couple is set above a dedication to Mercury and Rosmerta, and the goddess holds a patera in her lowered right hand and a purse against her breast. On a relief from Metz Mercury, holding his caduceus, hands a purse to Rosmerta, who receives it and steadies a cornucopia on her left arm. On the stele from Escolives-Sainte-Camille, where she is figured alone, she holds a patera in her right hand and a cornucopia full of fruit in her left. Wilhelm Schleiermacher distinguished two original types behind these images, one in which Rosmerta carries the patera and cornucopia of plenty, the other in which she shares Mercury's purse and caduceus, the two being combined in later reliefs. Colette Bémont noted that both sets of attributes are of Roman origin, so that they mark the goddess as a bringer of prosperity without pointing to anything specifically Celtic.

A minority of dedications name Rosmerta alone, without Mercury. Among the Aedui, at Gissey-le-Vieil and Escolives, she is invoked in the form 'sacred to the Augustus, to the goddess Rosmerta', a formula Bémont found characteristic of that region, and elsewhere she bears the title Rosmerta Augusta. On this ground it has been suggested that her cult was independent of, and perhaps older than, her pairing with Mercury. (Note: James MacKillop suggests that the appearance of Rosmerta alone may mean her cult predated that of either Mercury or Fortuna. The inference rests on the solo dedications and is not otherwise secured.)

In Britain, Rosmerta is known from iconography rather than epigraphy. Miranda Aldhouse-Green notes that on certain continental altars Mercury and Rosmerta are named as well as depicted, which allows the pair to be recognised in British sculptures where no inscription survives. Reliefs identified as Mercury and Rosmerta are known from Gloucester, including one from the Shakespeare Inn on which the goddess carries a double-axe, a patera and a stave-bound wooden bucket, and another from the Bon Marché site on which the pair appear together with Fortuna. Further British images come from Bath and from the rural sanctuary at Nettleton. Aldhouse-Green regards the wooden bucket as a distinctively British attribute, echoing the ale-buckets buried with high-status Britons in south-eastern England before the Roman conquest.

== Interpretation ==
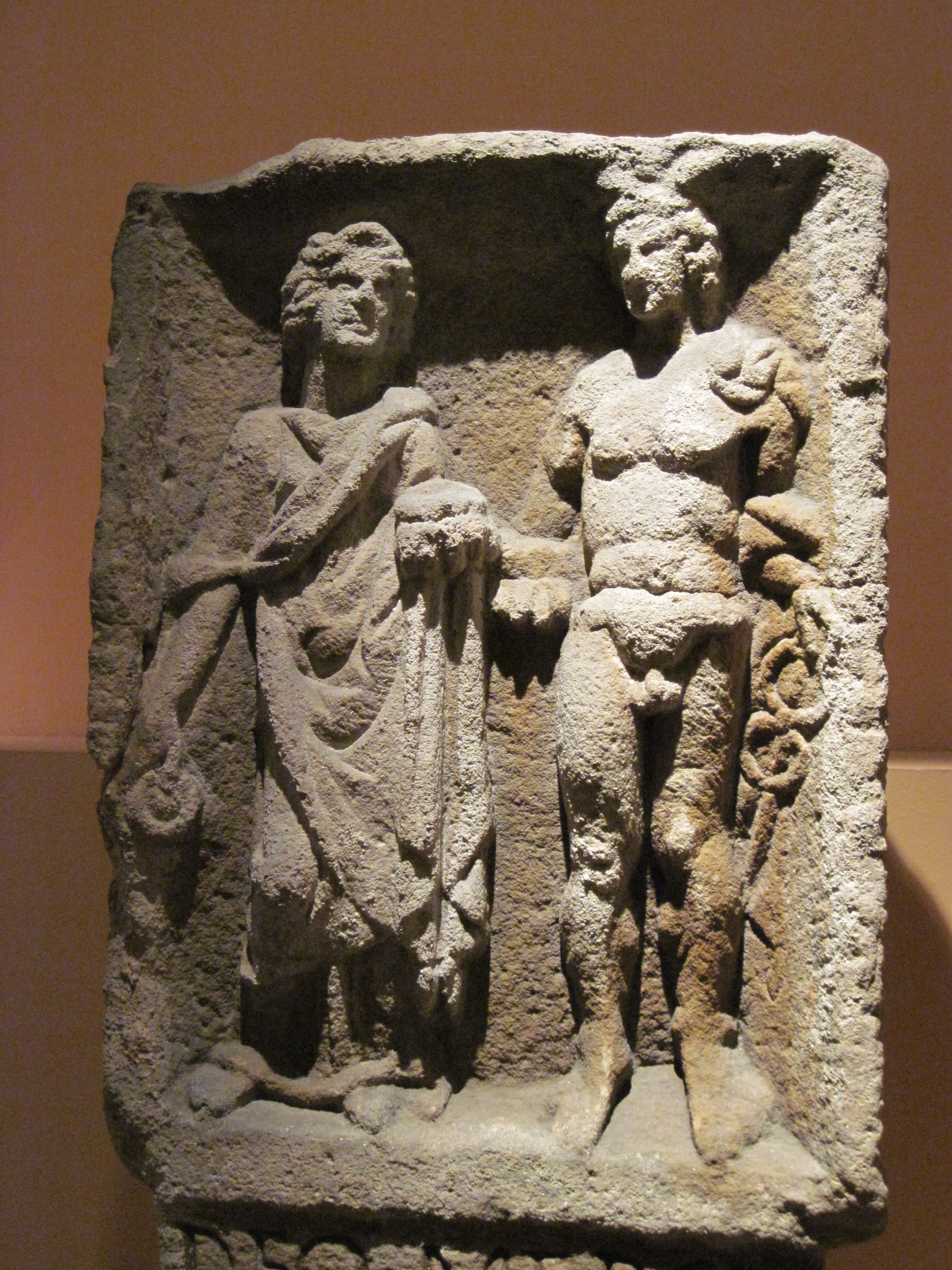
Relief of Mercury and Rosmerta from Eisenberg in present-day Rhineland-Palatinate.

The interpretation of Rosmerta rests mainly on her name, since her attributes of plenty are shared with many goddesses and give little indication of a more precise character. On this basis she is generally read as a goddess of abundance, wealth and fertility, and, in her frequent pairing with the commercial Mercury, as a bringer of gain and prosperity. Duval set her beside the personified Abundantia, and Aldhouse-Green took her to be a version of the Celtic fertility goddess.

The nature of her relationship to Mercury has been debated. Pierre Lambrechts held that she was essentially the female doublet of the god, without an existence of her own and without an attribute that sets her apart. De Vries thought this went too far, since Mercury is elsewhere paired with goddesses of various kinds and the worship of a divine couple was in any case widespread in Gaul. Bémont likewise argued against it, since the dedications from Escolives and Gissey-le-Vieil name Rosmerta alone and show that she could be the object of a cult in her own right. In these couples it is as a rule the goddess who keeps her Celtic name while the male partner takes a Roman one, a differential treatment that Maier suggests may express the subordination of the native goddess to the incoming Roman god. Aldhouse-Green reads the same pattern the other way, as an interpretatio gallica in which an indigenous consort was attached to the most popular of the Roman gods in order to temper his romanitas.

The Gaulish inscription from Lezoux pairs Rosmerta with a figure named Rigani ('the queen'), and has given rise to a further line of interpretation. Michel Lejeune read the text as a dedication 'to the queen and to Rosmerta', taking the two as distinct goddesses, while Maier notes that Rigani may instead be a byname or honorific title of Rosmerta herself. (Note: The reading of the Lezoux text is disputed. Lejeune rendered it as a dative, "hoc dicaui Reginae atque Rosmertae" ('I dedicated this to the Queen and to Rosmerta'). Miguel Villanueva Svensson instead took the endings as a third-person dual of the perfect, so that the queen and Rosmerta are the subjects who make the offering.) Koch connects Rigani with the medieval Welsh figure Rhiannon, whose name continues an earlier *Rīgantonā ('the divine queen'), and observes that the same root smert- underlies the Welsh darmerth, the word used in the Mabinogi for the wedding feast that Rhiannon prepares for Pwyll. He treats these correspondences as raising the question whether they reflect several goddesses with overlapping attributes or a single goddess known by several names. Proinsias Mac Cana set the pairing of Mercury and Rosmerta alongside the Irish coupling of Lugh with a goddess of the land and its prosperity. Attempts by Jean-Jacques Hatt to identify a sovereign goddess of this kind in pre-Roman iconography are regarded by Maier as requiring caution.

== Epigraphy ==
Rosmerta is named in around thirty Latin dedications, chiefly from eastern Gaul and the Germanies, and once in a Gaulish inscription from Lezoux. In most of the Latin texts she is paired with Mercury. (Note: A further dedication naming Mercury and Rosmerta, from Hettange-Grande (Mediomatrici), is classed among the inscriptiones falsae at CIL XIII, 629* and is not included here.)

Text	Find-spot	Divine name(s)	Translation	Reference	Comments
e[so] ieuri rigani rosmertiac	Lezoux (Puy-de-Dôme)	Rigani, Rosmerta	'I dedicated this to the queen and to Rosmerta' (Lejeune), or 'the queen and Rosmerta offered this'.	RIIG L-67	On a terracotta bowl. First half of the 1st century AD. The only attestation in the Gaulish language. The reading is disputed.
deae Rosmertae Dubnocaratiaci Marossus Marulli filius v(otum) s(olvit) l(ibens) m(erito) d(e) s(uo) d(edit)	Champoulet (Loiret)	Rosmerta	To the goddess Rosmerta, Marossus son of Marullus fulfilled his vow willingly and deservedly and gave it from his own means.	AE 1980, 643	Rosmerta named alone, with a further element Dubnocaratiaci.
Aug(usto) sacrum deae Rosmertae Iunianus(?) v(otum) s(olvit) l(ibens) m(erito)	Escolives-Sainte-Camille (Yonne)	Rosmerta	Sacred to the Augustus, to the goddess Rosmerta, Iunianus(?) fulfilled his vow willingly and deservedly.	AE 1968, 306	Rosmerta named alone, with the living emperor. From the territory of the Aedui. The dedicant's name is read as Iunianus or Ianuarius.
Aug(usto) sacrum deae Rosmertae Cn(aeus) Cominius Candidus et Apronia Avitilla v(otum) s(olverunt) l(ibentes) m(erito)	Gissey-le-Vieil (Côte-d'Or)	Rosmerta	Sacred to the Augustus, to the goddess Rosmerta, Gnaeus Cominius Candidus and Apronia Avitilla fulfilled their vow willingly and deservedly.	CIL XIII, 2831	Rosmerta named alone. From the territory of the Aedui.
In h(onorem) d(omus) d(ivinae) deo Mercurio et Rosmertae Docci Aprossus et Acceptus IIIIIIvir(i) Augustal(es) v(otum) s(olverunt) l(ibentes) m(erito)	Niederemmel (Treveri)	Mercury, Rosmerta	In honour of the divine house, to the god Mercury and Rosmerta, the Doccii Aprossus and Acceptus, seviri Augustales, fulfilled their vow willingly and deservedly.	CIL XIII, 4192	Set up by two brothers who were seviri Augustales.
[In h(onorem) d(omus) d(ivinae)] deo Mercurio et Rosmertae Adiutorius Ursulus v(otum) s(olvit) l(ibens) m(erito)	Niederemmel (Treveri)	Mercury, Rosmerta	In honour of the divine house, to the god Mercury and Rosmerta, Adiutorius Ursulus fulfilled his vow willingly and deservedly.	CIL XIII, 4193	
In h(onorem) d(omus) d(ivinae) deo Mercurio et deae Rosmertae Mercurialis Aug(usti) lib(ertus) adiutor tabularii v(otum) s(olvit) l(ibens) m(erito)	Niederemmel (Treveri)	Mercury, Rosmerta	In honour of the divine house, to the god Mercury and the goddess Rosmerta, Mercurialis, freedman of the Augustus, assistant record-keeper, fulfilled his vow willingly and deservedly.	CIL XIII, 4194	Dedicated by an imperial freedman.
In h(onorem) d(omus) d(ivinae) deo Mercurio et Rosmertae [aed]em(?) [...]mius Pr[ud]ens(?) ex iu[ss]u posuit	Niederemmel (Treveri)	Mercury, Rosmerta	In honour of the divine house, to the god Mercury and Rosmerta, [...]mius Prudens set up the shrine by command.	CIL XIII, 4195	
Deo Mercurio et deae Rosmertae aedem cum signis ornamentisque omnibus Doccius Acceptus tabularius IIIIIIvir Augustalis donavit [...] pro se liberisque suis dedicavit	Wasserbillig (Treveri)	Mercury, Rosmerta	To the god Mercury and the goddess Rosmerta, Doccius Acceptus, record-keeper and sevir Augustalis, gave the shrine with all its statues and ornaments and dedicated it on his own behalf and that of his children.	CIL XIII, 4208	A shrine dedication. Dated to AD 232.
Mercurio et Rosmer(tae) Messor Cani libertus	Niedaltdorf (Treveri)	Mercury, Rosmerta	To Mercury and Rosmerta, Messor, freedman of Canus.	CIL XIII, 4237	Dedicated by a freedman.
Deo Mercurio et Rosmertae Musicus Lilluti fil(ius) et sui(s) ex voto	Metz (Divodurum)	Mercury, Rosmerta	To the god Mercury and Rosmerta, Musicus son of Lillutus and his family, in fulfilment of a vow.	CIL XIII, 4311	
Mercurio Rosmert(ae) sacr(um) vicani Solimariac(ae)	Soulosse-sous-Saint-Élophe (Leuci)	Mercury, Rosmerta	Sacred to Mercury and Rosmerta, the villagers of Solimariaca.	CIL XIII, 4683	Set up by the inhabitants of a vicus.
D(eo) M(ercurio) et Rosmert(a)e dono dedit Albucia ex voto s(olvit) l(ibens) m(erito)	Soulosse-sous-Saint-Élophe (Leuci)	Mercury, Rosmerta	To the god Mercury and Rosmerta, Albucia gave this as a gift and fulfilled her vow willingly and deservedly.	CIL XIII, 4684	
Mercurio et Rosmert(ae) Citusmus Samotali fil(ius) v(otum) s(olvit) l(ibens) m(erito)	Soulosse-sous-Saint-Élophe (Leuci)	Mercury, Rosmerta	To Mercury and Rosmerta, Citusmus son of Samotalus fulfilled his vow willingly and deservedly.	CIL XIII, 4685	
Mercurio et Rosmertae sacrum Regalis et Augustus fra(tres) h(a)eredes Februarini v(otum) s(olverunt) l(ibentes) m(erito)	Morelmaison (Leuci)	Mercury, Rosmerta	Sacred to Mercury and Rosmerta, the brothers Regalis and Augustus, heirs of Februarinus, fulfilled their vow willingly and deservedly.	CIL XIII, 4705	
Deo Mercurio et Rosmertae Carantus Sacri pro salute Urbici fil(ii) v(otum) s(olvit) l(ibens) m(erito)	Saxon-Sion (Leuci)	Mercury, Rosmerta	To the god Mercury and Rosmerta, Carantus son of Sacer, for the welfare of his son Urbicus, fulfilled his vow willingly and deservedly.	CIL XIII, 4732	
Deo Mercurio et Rosmert(a)e Cantius Titi filius ex vot(o)	Langres (Lingones)	Mercury, Rosmerta	To the god Mercury and Rosmerta, Cantius son of Titus, in fulfilment of a vow.	CIL XIII, 5677	From the territory of the Lingones.
[Merc]urio et [Ros]mertae [Cint]usmus [et] Ael(ius?) Vest(...) v(otum) s(olverunt) l(ibentes) m(erito)	Grand	Mercury, Rosmerta	To Mercury and Rosmerta, Cintusmus and Aelius Vest[...] fulfilled their vow willingly and deservedly.	CIL XIII, 5939	
Deo Mercuri(o) et Rosmert(a)e L(ucius) Servandius Quietus ex voto in su(o) p(osuit)	Worms (Borbetomagus)	Mercury, Rosmerta	To the god Mercury and Rosmerta, Lucius Servandius Quietus set this up on his own land in fulfilment of a vow.	CIL XIII, 6222	
[In hono]rem d(omus) d(ivinae) [deo Merc]urio et Ro[smertae Se]cundius [...] ex voto pos[uit laetu]s lib(ens) m(erito)	Alzey (Altiaia)	Mercury, Rosmerta	In honour of the divine house, to the god Mercury and Rosmerta, Secundius [...] set this up in fulfilment of a vow, gladly, willingly and deservedly.	CIL XIII, 6263	
[Mercu]rio [et Ros]mert(a)e [sac(rum) vi]cani [vici N]ediens(is)	Spechbach (vicus Nediensis)	Mercury, Rosmerta	Sacred to Mercury and Rosmerta, the villagers of the vicus Nediensis.	CIL XIII, 6388	Set up by the inhabitants of a vicus.
In h(onorem) d(omus) d(ivinae) Merc[urio et] Rosmertae a[ram cum] signis du[obus] Flavia Pri[...] v(otum) s(olvit) l(ibens) m(erito)	Andernach (Antunnacum)	Mercury, Rosmerta	In honour of the divine house, to Mercury and Rosmerta, Flavia Pri[...] set up the altar with two statues in fulfilment of a vow, willingly and deservedly.	CIL XIII, 7683	An altar with two accompanying statues.
In honor(em) d(omus) d(ivinae) Mercur(io) Abgatiac(o) Rosmertae aedem qui filius	Kleinich	Mercury Abgatiacus, Rosmerta	In honour of the divine house, to Mercury Abgatiacus and Rosmerta, the shrine [...].	Finke 80	Mercury carries the epithet Abgatiacus.
In h(onorem) d(omus) d(ivinae) deo Mercurio Excingiorigiati et Rosmert(a)e C(aius) Satu[r]ninius Viriaucus v(otum) s(olvit) l(ibens) l(aetus) m(erito) aedem d(ono) d(edit)	Uess	Mercury Excingiorigiatis, Rosmerta	In honour of the divine house, to the god Mercury Excingiorigiatis and Rosmerta, Gaius Saturninius Viriaucus fulfilled his vow willingly, gladly and deservedly and gave the shrine.	AE 1935, 29	Mercury carries the epithet Excingiorigiatis.
M(ercurio) et Ros(mertae) Oa[...]llu Vadarilla(e) fili(i) v(ota) s(olverunt) l(ibentes) m(erito)	(territory of the Lingones)	Mercury, Rosmerta	To Mercury and Rosmerta, the sons Oa[...]llus [and ...], children of Vadarilla, fulfilled their vows willingly and deservedly.	CIL XIII, 11263	
Deo Mercu(rio) et Rosmer(tae) M(arcus) Adiutorius Memor d(ecurio) c(ivitatis) St(...) ex voto s(olvit) l(ibens) m(erito)	Eisenberg	Mercury, Rosmerta	To the god Mercury and Rosmerta, Marcus Adiutorius Memor, town councillor of the civitas St[...], fulfilled his vow willingly and deservedly in fulfilment of a vow.	CIL XIII, 11696	Dedicated by a town councillor. On a relief of the pair.
Invicto Mithrae Marti Camulo Mercurio Rosmertae Q(uintus) Axius Aelianus v(ir) e(gregius) proc(urator) Aug(ustorum)	Sarmizegetusa (Dacia)	Mars Camulus, Mercury, Rosmerta (with Mithras)	To the Unconquered Mithras, to Mars Camulus, to Mercury and Rosmerta, Quintus Axius Aelianus, of equestrian rank, procurator of the emperors.	AE 1998, 1100	Dedicated by the procurator Quintus Axius Aelianus. Dated to AD 235–238.
Rosmert(ae) Aug(ustae) ex stipibus	Dompierre-sur-Authie	Rosmerta Augusta	To Rosmerta Augusta, from the offerings.	AE 2002, 1003	Rosmerta named alone, with the title Augusta, paid for from an offering-box.
Ros]mertai [...]	Sankt Michael am Zollfeld (Virunum, Noricum)	Rosmerta	To Rosmerta.	AE 2003, 1297	Rosmerta named alone. Fragmentary. Dated to the 1st century AD.
Mercurio et [Rosmertae] Viturelius [...] v(otum) s(olvit) l(ibens) [l(aetus) m(erito)]	Rainbach	Mercury, Rosmerta	To Mercury and Rosmerta, Viturelius [...] fulfilled his vow willingly, gladly and deservedly.	AE 2019, 1132	
R[o]sm[ertae?] [...]	Genainville (Val-d'Oise)	Rosmerta (?)	To Rosmerta (?).	AE 1996, 1078	Fragmentary. The reading of the name is uncertain.
