= Pillar of the Boatmen =

Roman column in Paris, France

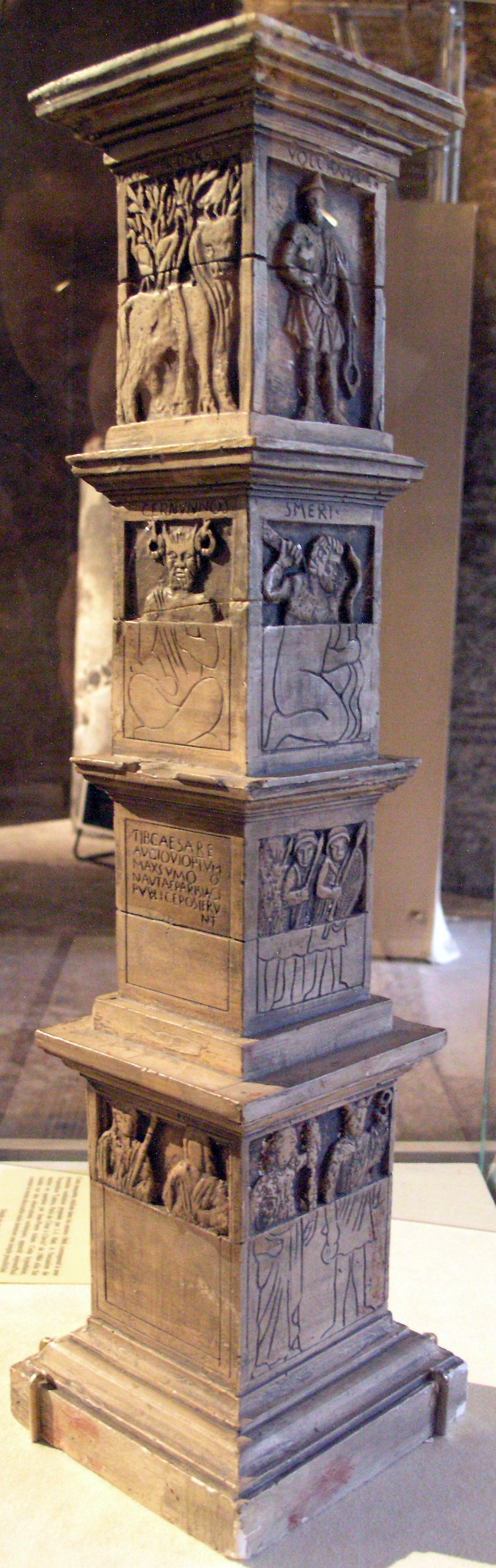
Model reconstructing the Pillar of the Boatmen in the Musée de Cluny

The Pillar of the Boatmen (French: Pilier des nautes) is a monumental Roman column erected in Lutetia (modern Paris) in honour of Jupiter by the guild of boatmen in the 1st century AD. It is the oldest monument in Paris and is one of the earliest pieces of representational Gallo-Roman art to carry a written inscription.

The Roman name for the monument is Nautae Parisiaci (the sailors of the Parisii, who were a tribe of Gauls). It was found re-used in the 4th century city wall on the Île de la Cité and is now displayed in the frigidarium of the Thermes de Cluny.

== Description ==
The pillar is made of a type of limestone called pierre de Saint-Leu-d'Esserent, from Saint-Leu, Oise, France. The original pillar would have been 5.24m high, 91 cm wide at the base and 74 cm wide at the top. It is likely to have been formed in four tiers and, although the order from top to bottom is reasonably certain from the relative sizes of the blocks, the rotational order in which the blocks were arranged is unknown; there are 64 possibilities. However, there is no proof that they were stacked, and could also have been two pairs of altars.

The guild was for relatively wealthy shipowners or traders. An indication of the power of the guild is shown by one of the sculptures of the pillar where they parade in arms with shields and spears, a privilege granted by the Romans, which is exceptional in less than half a century after the conquest of Gaul. The guild was also the first known society of Paris.

=== Inscription ===
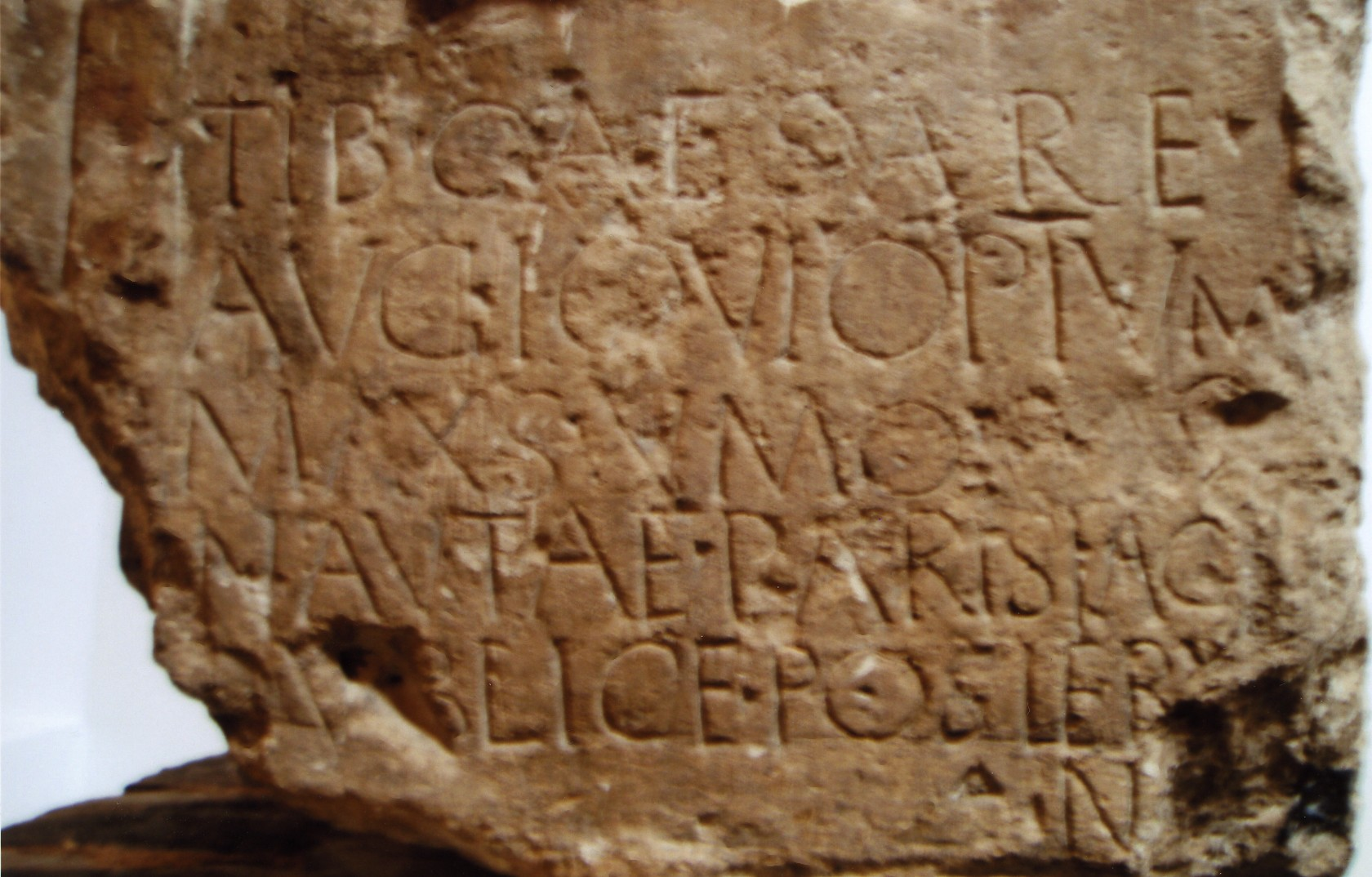
Dedication to Jupiter under Tiberius (14–37 AD)

Written in Latin with Gaulish language features, the inscription mingles Roman deities with gods that are distinctly Celtic. The pillar is dated by a dedication to Tiberius Caesar Augustus, that is Tiberius who became emperor in 14 AD. It was set up publicly (publice posierunt) by the guild of sailors of Lutetia, from the civitas of the Parisii (nautae Parisiaci). These sailors would have been merchants who travelled along the Seine.

The main dedication is to Jupiter in the form of Iovis Optimus Maximus ("Jove Best and Greatest"). The names of the emperor and the supreme deity appear in the dative case as the recipients of the dedication. The remaining theonyms are nominative legends that accompany individual depictions of the gods. These are (in the order they appear below) Jove, Tarvos Trigaranos (the Bull with three Cranes), Volcanus (Vulcan), Esus, Cernunnos, Castor, Smertrios, and Fortuna.

The dedication is as follows:

Tib(erio) Caesare /
Aug(usto) Ioui Optum[o] /
Maxsumo /
nautae Parisiaci /
publice posierunt //
Eurises // Senan[t] U[s]e[t]lo[n] [-] //
Iouis // Taruos Trigaranus //
Volcanus // Esus //
[C]ernunnos // Castor // [---] //
Smer[---] //
Fort[una] // [--]TVS[--] // D[--]

Pillar of the Boatmen
Side 1	Side 2	Side 3	Side 4
[C]ernunnos	Smer[trios]	Castor	[Pollux]
Iouis	Esus	Taruos Trigaranus	Volcanus
Tib(erio) Caesare Aug(usto) Iovi Optum[o] Maxsumo nautae Parisiaci publice posierunt	[three armed beardless men]	Eurises [three armed bearded men]	Senan[t] U[s]e[t]lo[n] [--] [three robed male and female figures]
Fort[una with Iuno?]	[two goddesses]	[--]V[--] [Mars with consort (Venus?)]	[Mercurius with Rosmerta?]

The pillar provides the only undisputed instance of the divine name Cernunnos. The Gaulish theonyms are presented as deity names in their own right, and not as epithets for Roman gods (by contrast, see the many Celtic gods syncretized with Mars). Other figures appear on the pillar without legible inscriptions, including the Roman gods Mars and Mercury, who can be identified by their conventional iconography, and other unidentified figures, mainly female.

=== Deities ===
The top tier, of which only the top half remains, depicts Cernunnos, Smertrios, and Castor and Pollux. Cernunnos has stag's antlers from which hang two torcs. From the amount of the body in the top half, Cernunnos is assumed to have been depicted in a cross-legged seated position as is typical of other Cernunnos depictions; there is insufficient room for him to be seated on a chair or standing. Smertrios is shown kneeling, brandishing a club and attacking a snake. Castor and Pollux are shown standing beside their horses, each holding a spear.

The second tier, which is complete, shows Jupiter, Esus, Tarvos Trigaranus and Vulcan. Jupiter is shown standing, holding a spear and a thunderbolt. Esus is shown standing beside a willow tree, which he is cutting down with an axe. Tarvos Trigaranus is depicted as a large, heavy-set bull standing in front of a willow tree. Two cranes stand on his back and a third on his head. Vulcan is shown standing, with hammer and tongs.

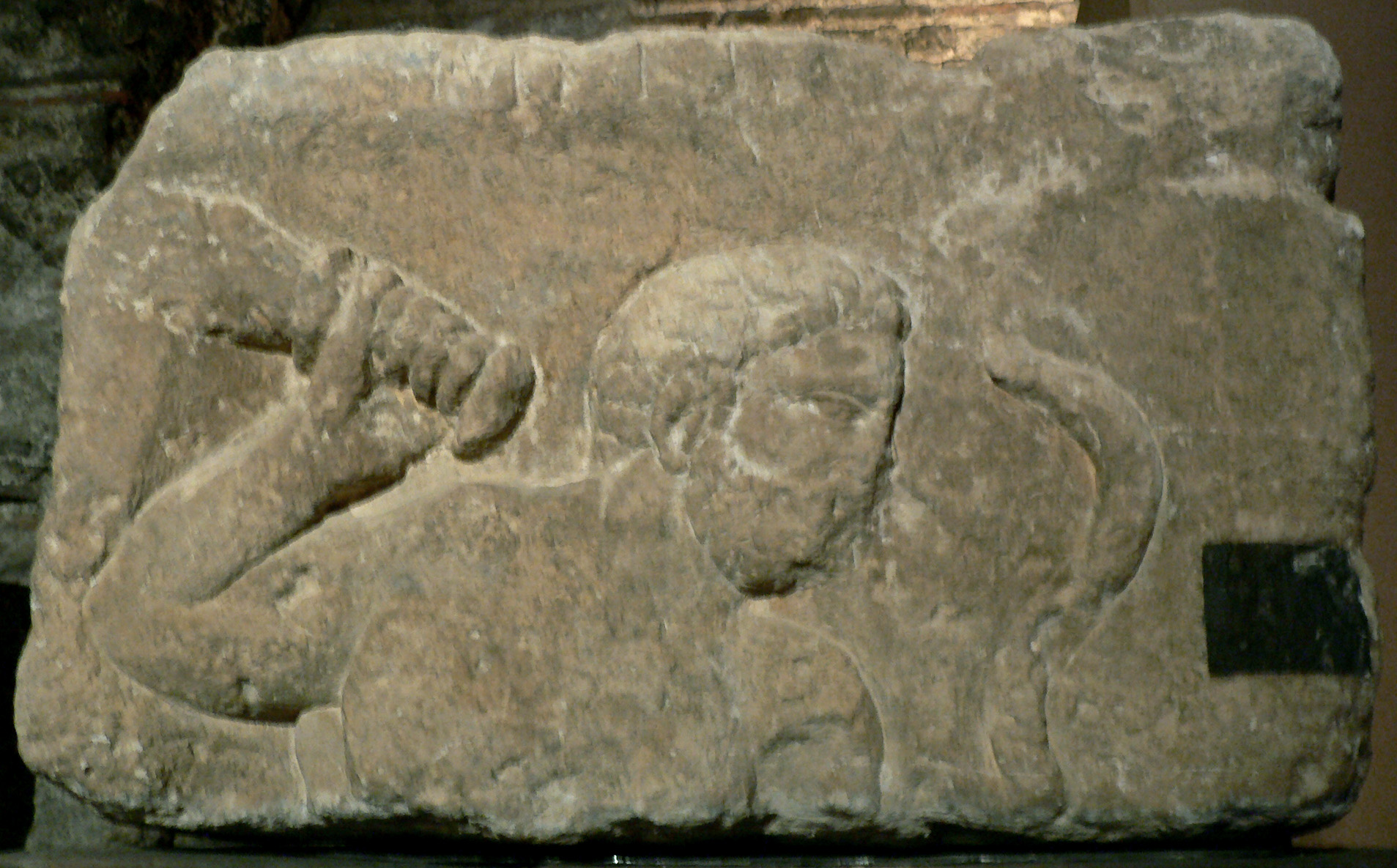
Smertrios

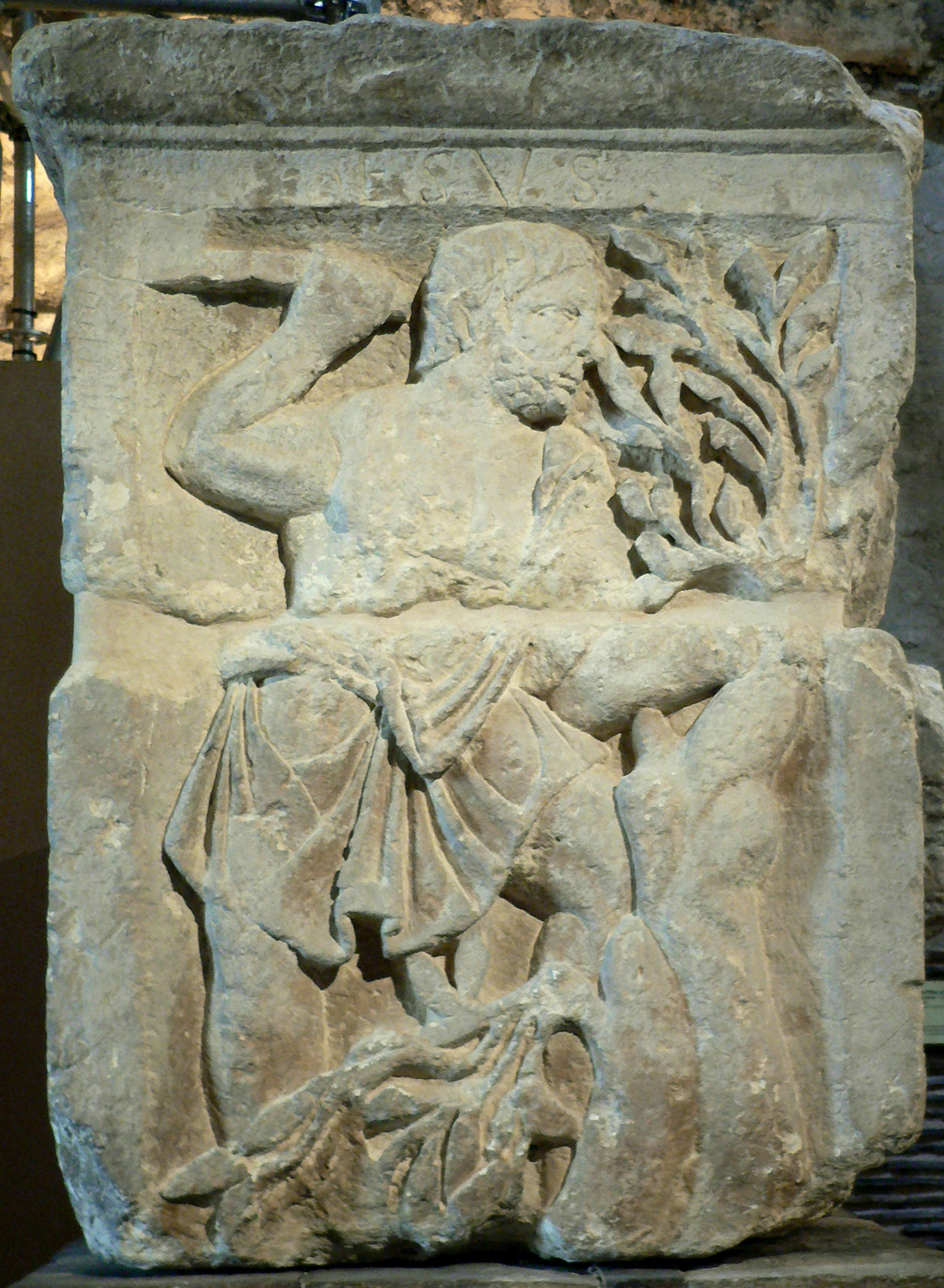
Esus

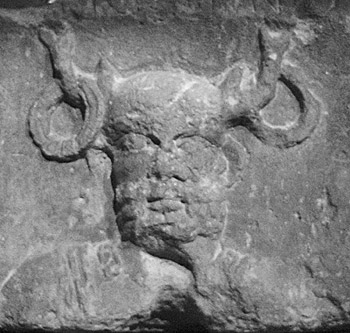
Cernunnos

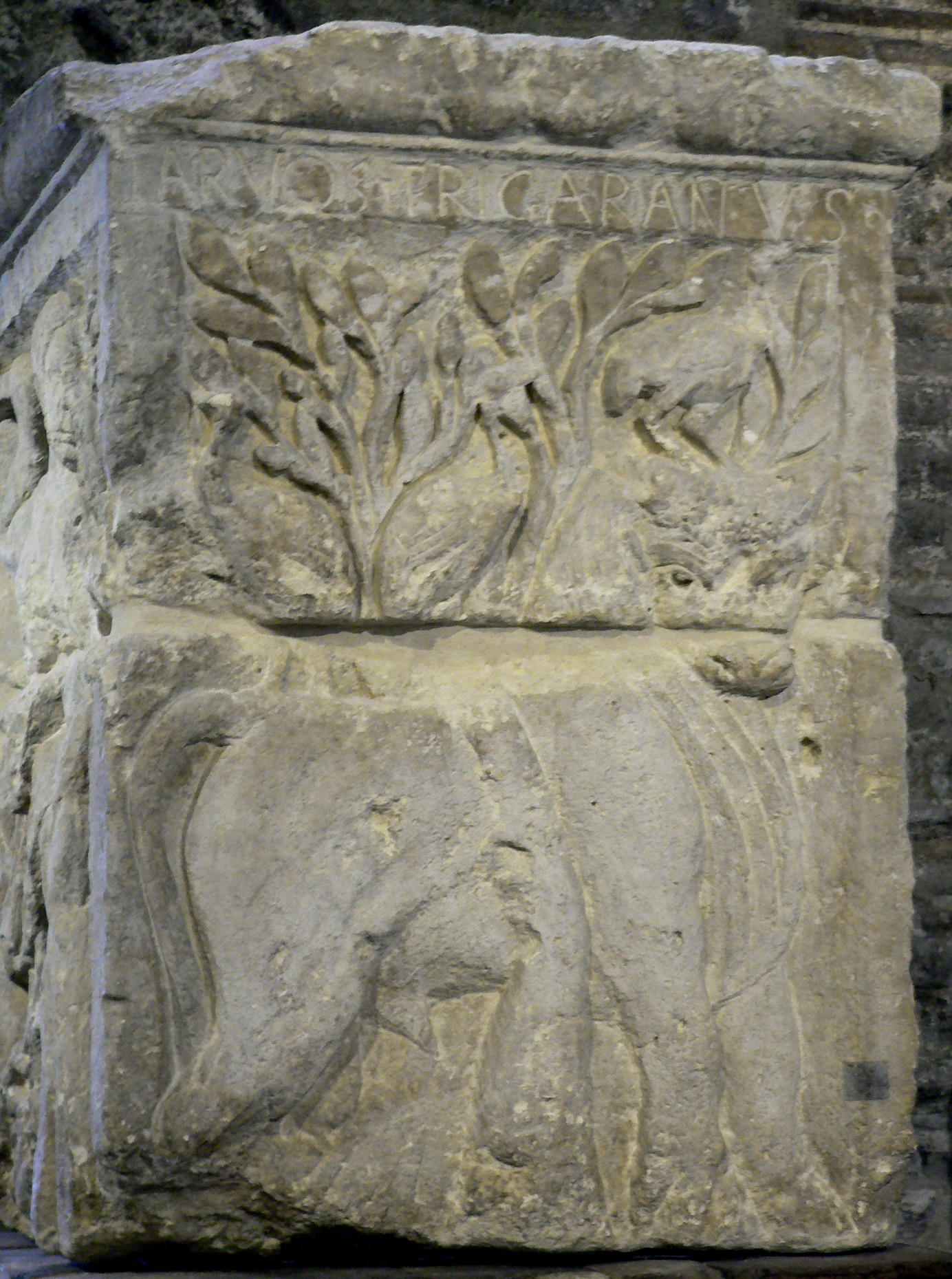
Tarvos Trigaranus

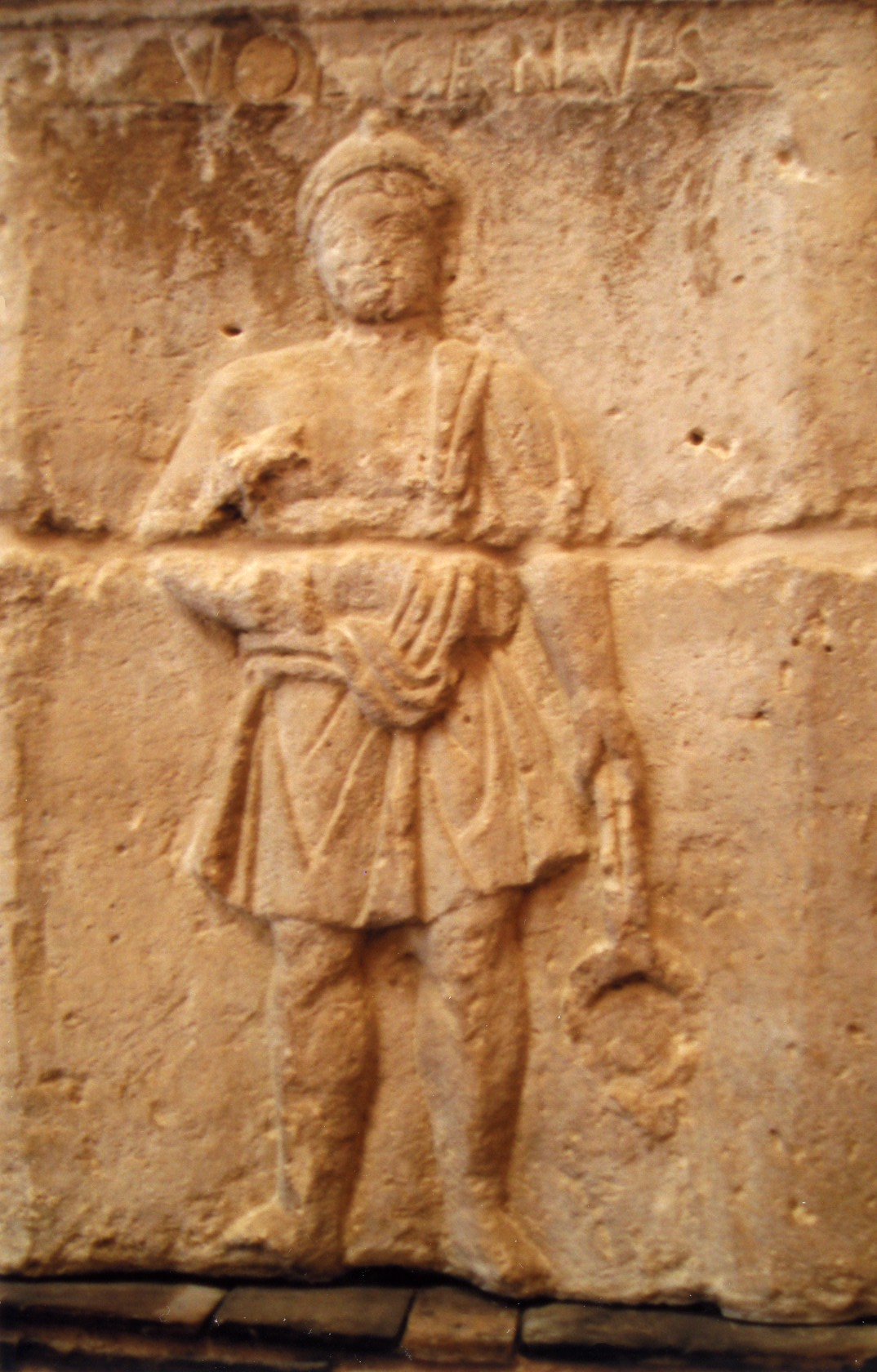
Vulcan

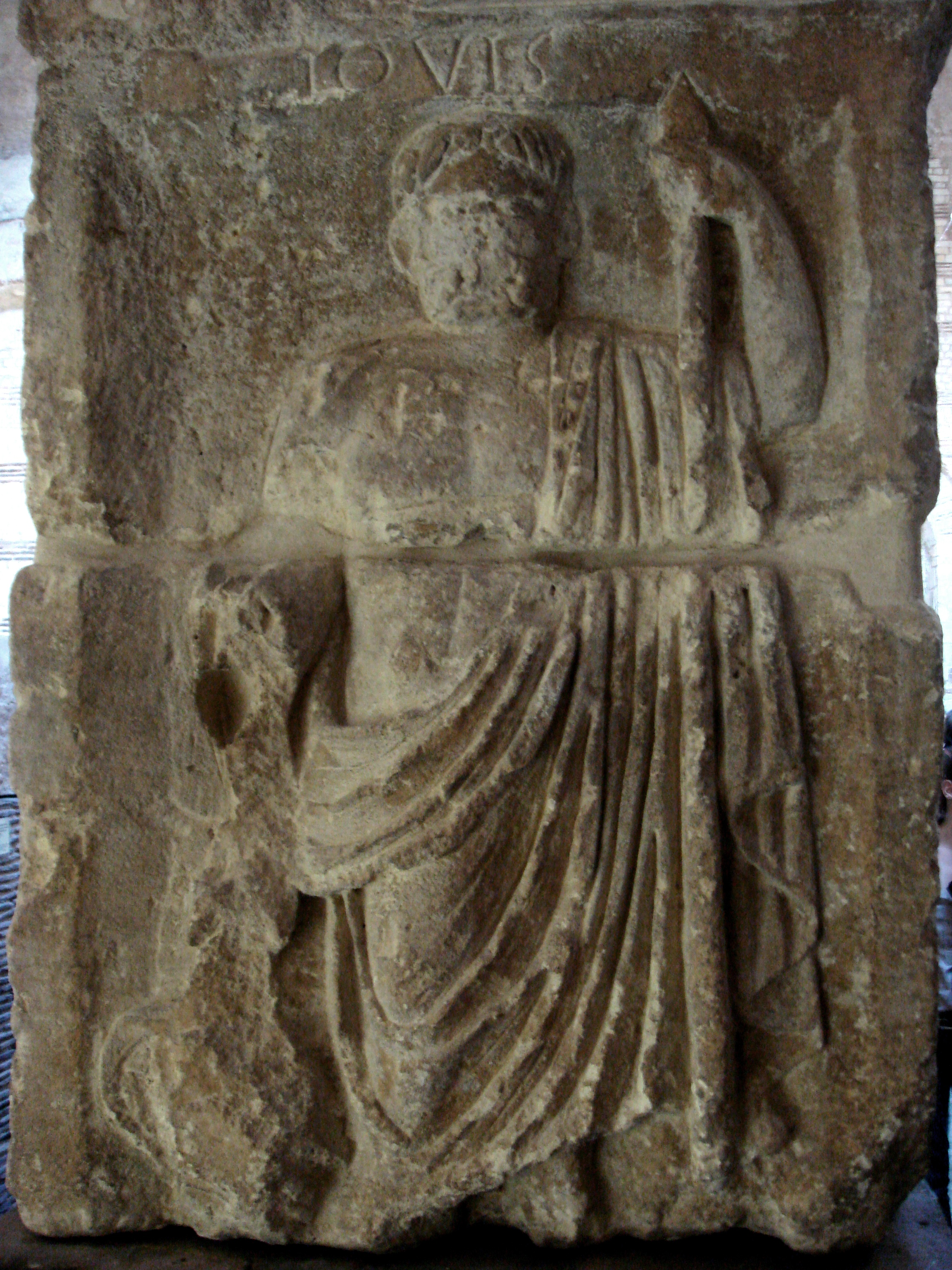
Jupiter

=== Block of dedication ===
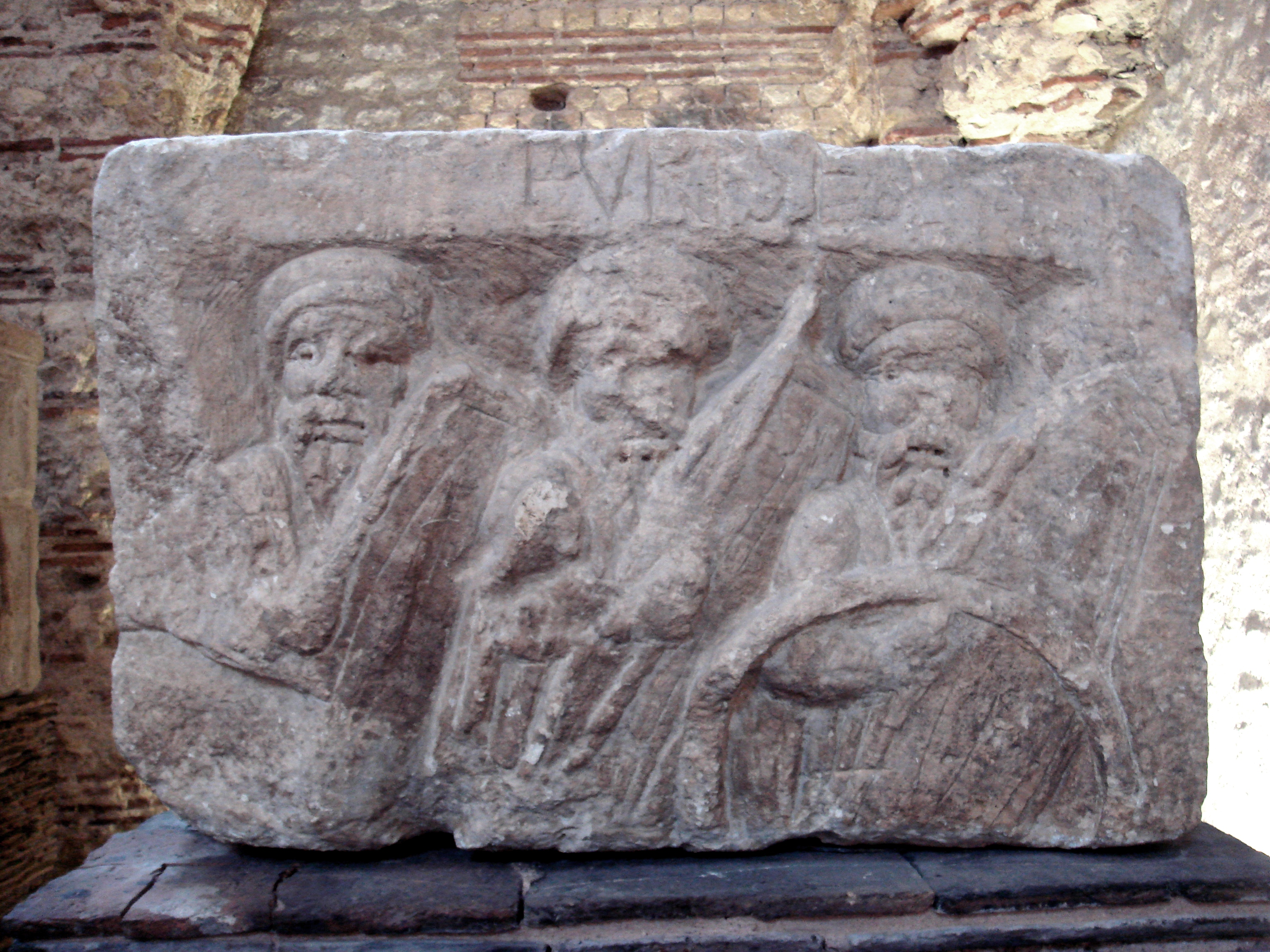
Warriors

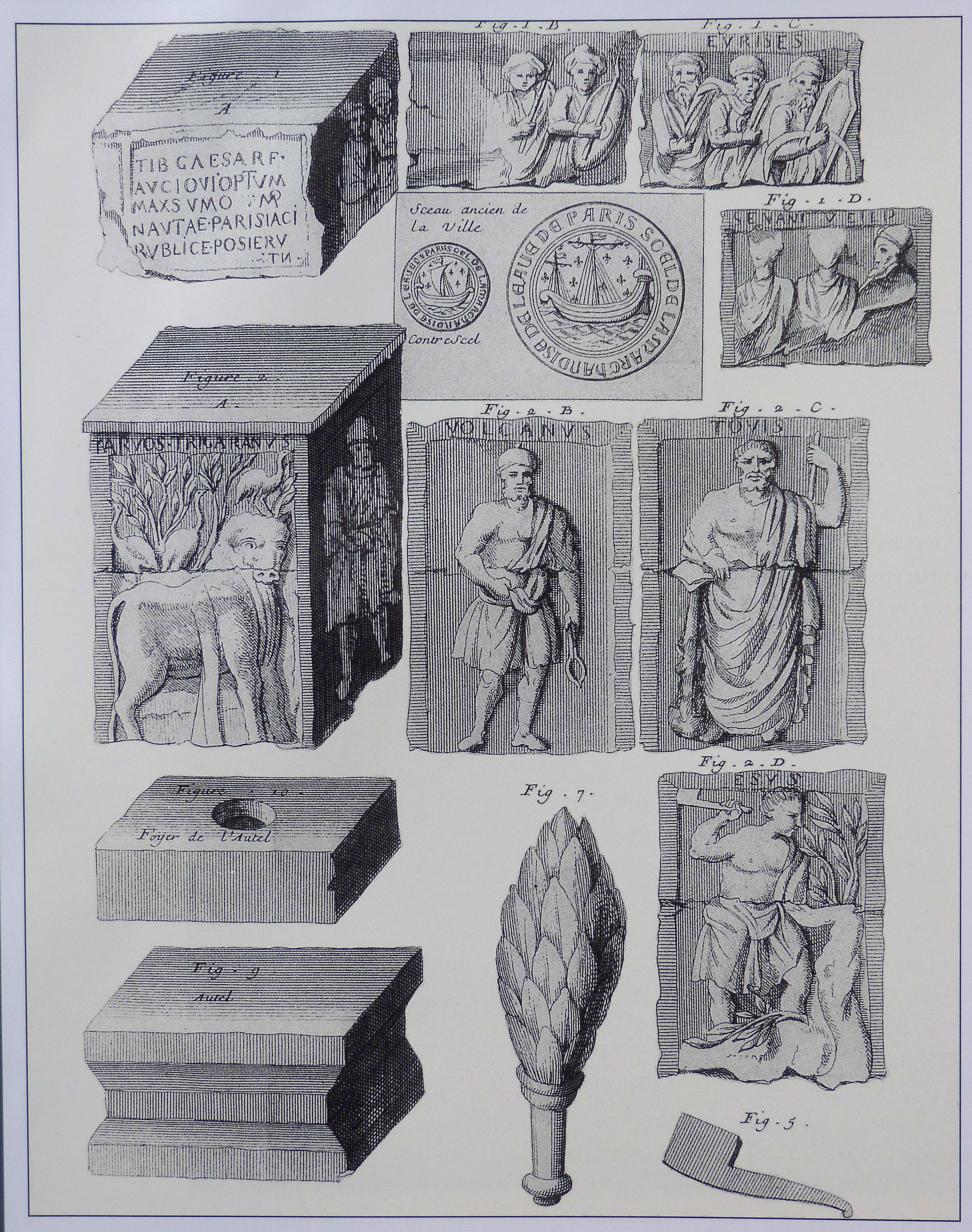
Engraving of the elements found during the diggings, Histoire de Paris, tome 1, Michel Félibien

The third tier, the top half of which survives, bears the main dedicatory inscription on one face. Since this has a border and appears complete, the content of the bottom half of this face is unknown. The other sides show a group of three young men with shields and spears; a group of three older, bearded men with spears and shields, bearing the inscription Iurises; and a group of three figures, at least one of which is female. They are unarmed, dressed in flowing gowns, and have an inscription Senani U[s]eiloni.

The fourth, lowest tier is slightly wider than the upper three. Only the top half remains, and the inscriptions are badly damaged. Each face shows a pair of standing figures. Mars, with spear and sword, is accompanied by a female deity with large round earrings and a flowing garment which is held over one arm. Mercury, identifiable by his caduceus, is depicted with a goddess who may be Rosmerta, his frequent companion in Gallic art. Fortuna is accompanied by another female deity, perhaps Juno. Two other unidentified female deities are on the fourth face, the one to the left is naked to the waist and holds a large cloak behind her with upraised arms; the other is clothed and has large round earrings.

== History of the pillar ==
Some time in the 3rd century, the stone blocks that formed the pillar were broken into two and used to reinforce the foundations of the walls along the riverbank. Over time, the island grew slightly so that the 3rd-century wharfs are now a dozen metres from the banks of the river Seine.

The Cathedral of Saint Étienne was founded by Childebert in 528 AD on the site of the Gallo-Roman temple; Notre-Dame de Paris was in turn built over this in 1163.

The pillar was found on 6 March 1710 during the construction of a crypt under the nave of Notre-Dame de Paris and first published by Baudelot de Dairval in 1712. Not all of the pieces were recovered; for three of the tiers, only the top half is extant.

After discovery, the stone blocks were taken to the Hôtel de Cluny, a medieval ecclesiastical building constructed over the remains of a 2nd-century Roman bath house. This became the Musée de Cluny and then, the Musée national du Moyen Age.

In 2001, the blocks were restored, removing the black patina of grime that had accumulated on the surface of the stone over the three centuries since their discovery. The restored stones are once again on display in the museum.

== See also ==
- Gallo-Roman culture
- Gundestrup cauldron
- Lyon cup
- Votive Column of Lisieux

== Bibliography ==
- Carbonnières, Philippe (1997). Lutèce : Paris ville romaine. Collection "Découvertes Gallimard". Vol. 330. Paris: Gallimard/Paris-Musées. ISBN 2-07-053389-1.
- d'Arbois de Jubainville, G. (1898). "Esus, Tarvos, Trigaranus". Revue Celtique. XIX: 245–251.
- Harl, Ortolf, "Kaiser Tiberius und die nautae Parisiaci: Das Pfeilermonument aus Notre-Dame de Paris und seine Stellung in Religion, Kunst und Wirtschaft Nordgalliens", Introduction by Henri Lavagne: "Le pilier des Nautes, hier et aujourd'hui" (Monuments Piot, 99, 2019, p. 71-225.
- Lejeune, Michel (1988) Recueil des inscriptions gauloises, volume 2-1 Textes gallo-étrusques. Textes gallo-latins sur pierre. Paris, Editions du CNRS. pp. 166–169.
