= Baco (god) =

Gaulish boar-deity

Baco (also Bacon) is a Gaulish Celtic god, known from Gallo-Roman inscriptions found in the areas of Chalon-sur-Saône and Eauze. The inscription at Chalon-sur-Saône, dated to 69 to 96 CE, was dedicated by a decurion in the Roman cavalry.

== Origin ==
The god's name (also Gallicized as Bacon) indicates that he was probably a boar-god, of whom many are recorded in the Celtic world. An account of Baco is also preserved in the hagiography of a St Marcel de Chalon, martyred in 177 or 179 CE. According to L. Armand-Calliat, the cult of this Baco was inherited by St Anthony the Great, venerated in the Haute-Bourgogne region on 17 January.
