= Marcel de Chalon =

Saint Marcel de Chalon (d. 177 or 179 CE) was a Gallo-Roman saint, martyred at Chalon-sur-Saône under Marcus Aurelius.

== Biography ==
Though St Marcel's cult and the fact of his martyrdom (recorded as early as Gregory of Tours) are well-attested, his life is mainly known from a later hagiography (in two recensions) which is of dubious reliability.

As this hagiography has it, after refusing to worship before Mars, Mercury, and Minerva, St Marcel was condemned to death by a governor named Priscus. The saint was quartered by being tied between bent two tree branches, flogged, delivered to the flames, and finally buried up to the waist, where he agonized for three days and died on 4 September 177 or 179 CE.

Elements of the hagiography of St Marcel have been compared with aspects of the cults of the Gaulish pagan gods Esus and Baco.

His feast day is celebrated on September 4.
