= Smertrios =

God in Gaul and Noricum equated with Mars

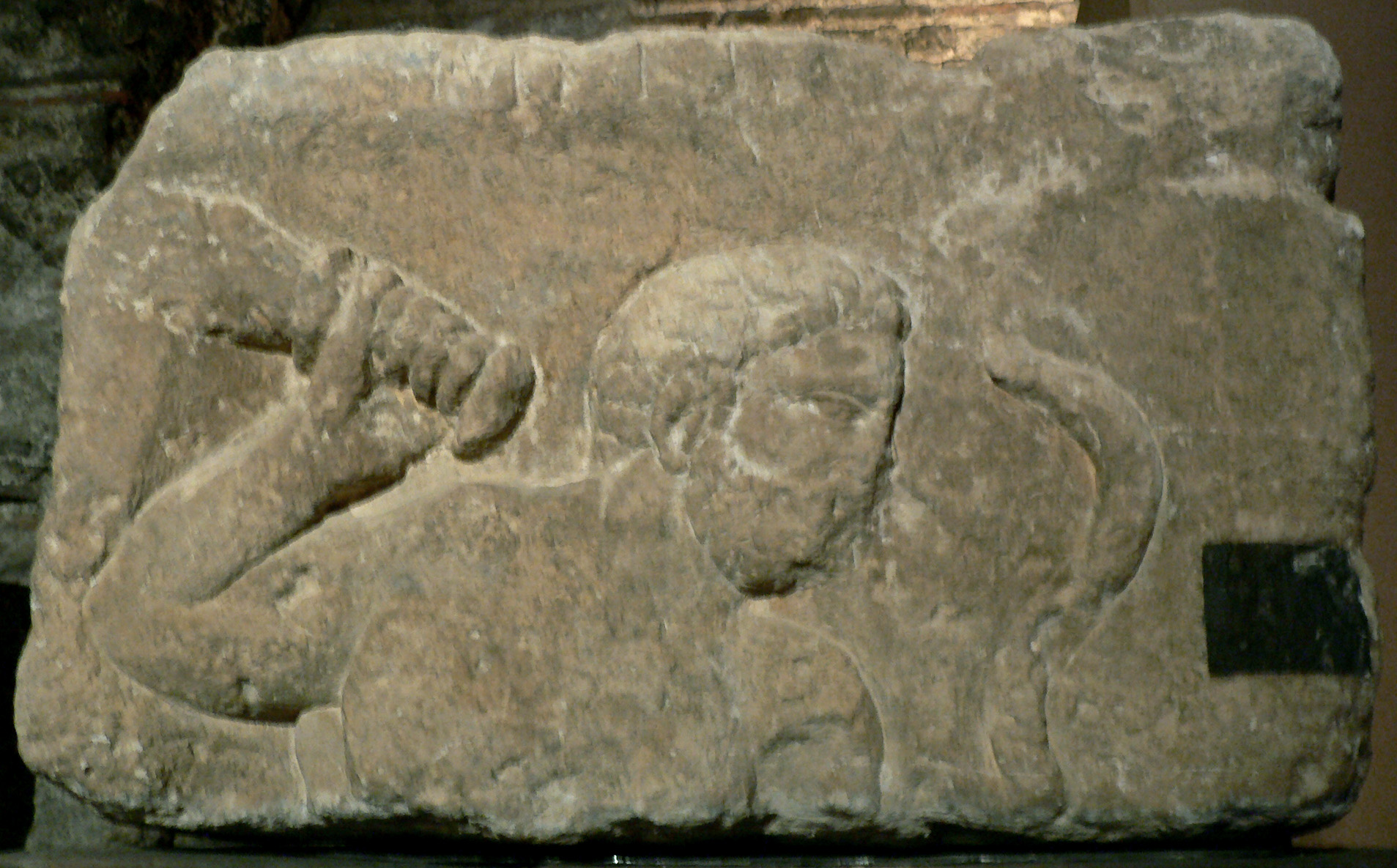
Relief of Smertrius from the Pillar of the Boatmen, Paris.

In Gallo-Roman religion, Smertrios or Smertrius was a god worshipped in Gaul and Noricum. In Roman times he was equated with Mars. His name contains the same root as that of the goddess Rosmerta and may mean "The Purveyor" or "The Provider", a title rather than a true name. Smertulitanus may be a variant name for the same god.

Smertrius is one of the Gaulish gods depicted on the Pillar of the Boatmen, discovered in Paris. Here is depicted as a well-muscled bearded man confronting a snake which rears up in front of him. The god brandishes an object which has usually been interpreted as a club but which rather resembles a torch or firebrand.

The normal interpretation of the god's attribute as a club has led to the identification, by modern scholars, of Smertrius and Hercules. Other evidence links Smertrius with the Celtic version of Mars: at Möhn near Trier, a spring sanctuary was dedicated to Mars Smertrius and his consort Ancamna. Coins found here indicate that there was a shrine here before the Roman period. Another Treveran inscription links Mars and Smertrius. Smertrius himself is known outside Gaul, for example on a fragmentary inscription at Grossbach in Austria.
