= Tarvos Trigaranus =

Gaulish bull god

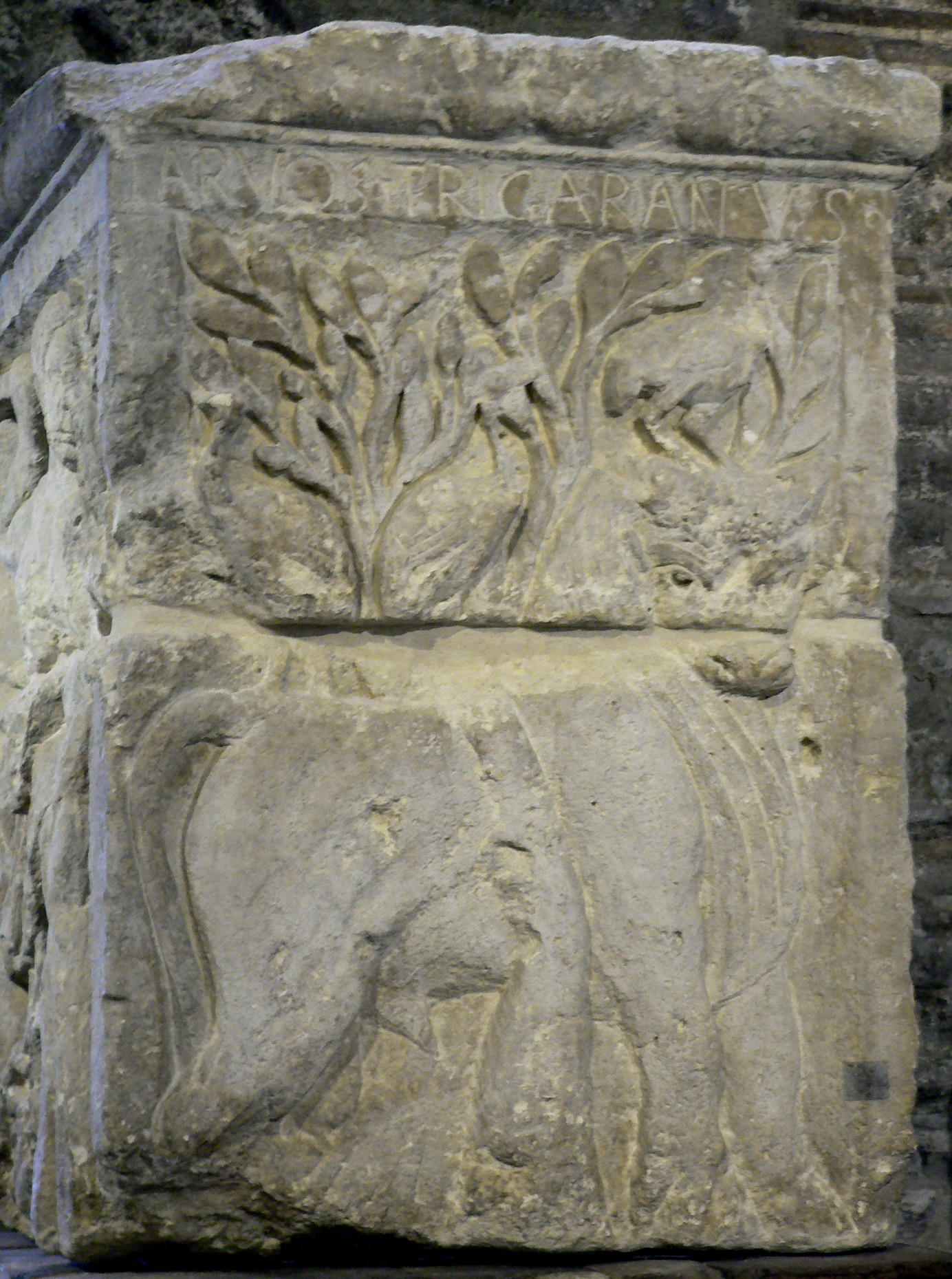
- The relief of Tarvos Trigaranus on the Pillar of the Boatmen.
- Symbol: Bull with three cranes

Tarvos Trigaranus or Taruos Trigaranos is a divine figure who appears on a relief panel of the Pillar of the Boatmen as a bull with three cranes perched on his back. He stands under a tree, and on an adjacent panel, the god Esus is chopping down a tree, possibly a willow, with an axe.

In the Gaulish language, taruos means "bull," found in Old Irish as tarb (/tarβ/), in Modern Irish/Gaelic as tarbh and in Welsh as tarw (compare "bull" in other Indo-European languages such as Latin taurus from Greek "ταύρος" or Lithuanian taŭras). Garanus is the crane (garan in Welsh, Old Cornish and Breton; see also geranos, the ritual "crane dance" of ancient Greece). Treis, or tri- in compound words, is the number three (cf. Irish trí, Welsh tri).

A pillar from Trier shows a man with an axe cutting down a tree in which sit three birds and a bull's head. The juxtaposition of images has been compared to the Tarvos Trigaranus and Esus panels on the Boatmen monument. It is possible that statues of a bull with three horns, such as the one from Autun (Burgundy, France, anciently Augustodunum) are related to this deity.

The Saturnian moon Tarvos is named after Tarvos Trigaranus, following a convention of naming members of its moon group after Gallic mythological figures.

== See also ==
- Celtic mythology
- Triple deities
- Twrch Trwyth
