= Escolives-Sainte-Camille =

- Commune
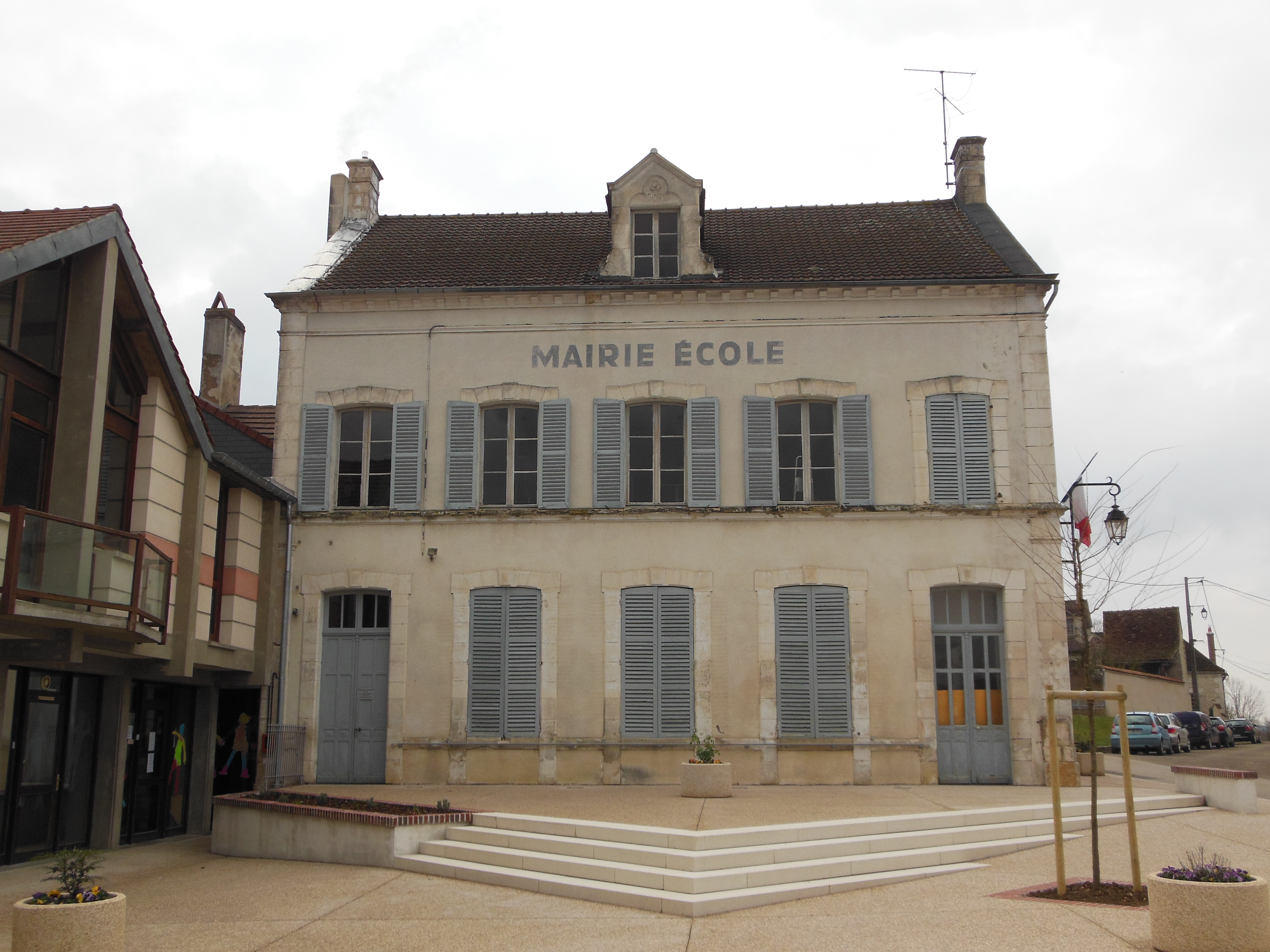
- The town hall in Escolives
- Location of Escolives-Sainte-Camille
- Location within France Location within Bourgogne-Franche-Comté
- Coordinates: 47°43′08″N 3°36′32″E
- Country: France
- Region: Bourgogne-Franche-Comté
- Department: Yonne
- Arrondissement: Auxerre
- Canton: Vincelles
- Intercommunality: CA Auxerrois
- Area^{1}: 7.52 km^{2} (2.90 sq mi)
- Highest elevation: 244 m (801 ft)
- Lowest elevation: 102 m (335 ft)
- Population (2023): 719
  - Density: 95.6/km^{2} (248/sq mi)
- Time zone: UTC+01:00 (CET)
  - Summer (DST): UTC+02:00 (CEST)
- INSEE/Postal code: 89155 /89290
- ^{1} French Land Register data, which excludes lakes, ponds, glaciers > 1 km^{2} (0.386 sq mi or 247 acres) and river estuaries.

Escolives-Sainte-Camille (French pronunciation: [ekɔliv sɛ̃t kamij]) is a commune in the Yonne department in Bourgogne-Franche-Comté in north-central France.

== See also ==
- Communes of the Yonne department
