= Gissey-le-Vieil =

- Commune
- Location of Gissey-le-Vieil
- Location within France Location within Bourgogne-Franche-Comté
- Coordinates: 47°19′26″N 4°28′59″E
- Country: France
- Region: Bourgogne-Franche-Comté
- Department: Côte-d'Or
- Arrondissement: Montbard
- Canton: Semur-en-Auxois

Government
  - Mayor (2020–2026): Chantal Criblier
- Area^{1}: 8.38 km^{2} (3.24 sq mi)
- Elevation: 349 m (1,145 ft)
- Highest elevation: 505 m (1,657 ft)
- Lowest elevation: 337 m (1,106 ft)
- Population (2023): 104
  - Density: 12.4/km^{2} (32.1/sq mi)
- Time zone: UTC+01:00 (CET)
  - Summer (DST): UTC+02:00 (CEST)
- INSEE/Postal code: 21298 /21350
- ^{1} French Land Register data, which excludes lakes, ponds, glaciers > 1 km^{2} (0.386 sq mi or 247 acres) and river estuaries.

Gissey-le-Vieil (French pronunciation: [ʒisɛ lə vjɛj]) is a commune in the Côte-d'Or department in eastern France.

== Population ==
Historical population
| Year | Pop. | ±% p.a. |
|---|---|---|
| 1968 | 128 | — |
| 1975 | 101 | −3.33% |
| 1982 | 72 | −4.72% |
| 1990 | 74 | +0.34% |
| 1999 | 104 | +3.85% |
| 2007 | 105 | +0.12% |
| 2012 | 101 | −0.77% |
| 2017 | 113 | +2.27% |
| 2023 | 104 | −1.37% |
Source: INSEE

== See also ==
- Communes of the Côte-d'Or department
