= Soulosse-sous-Saint-Élophe =

- Commune
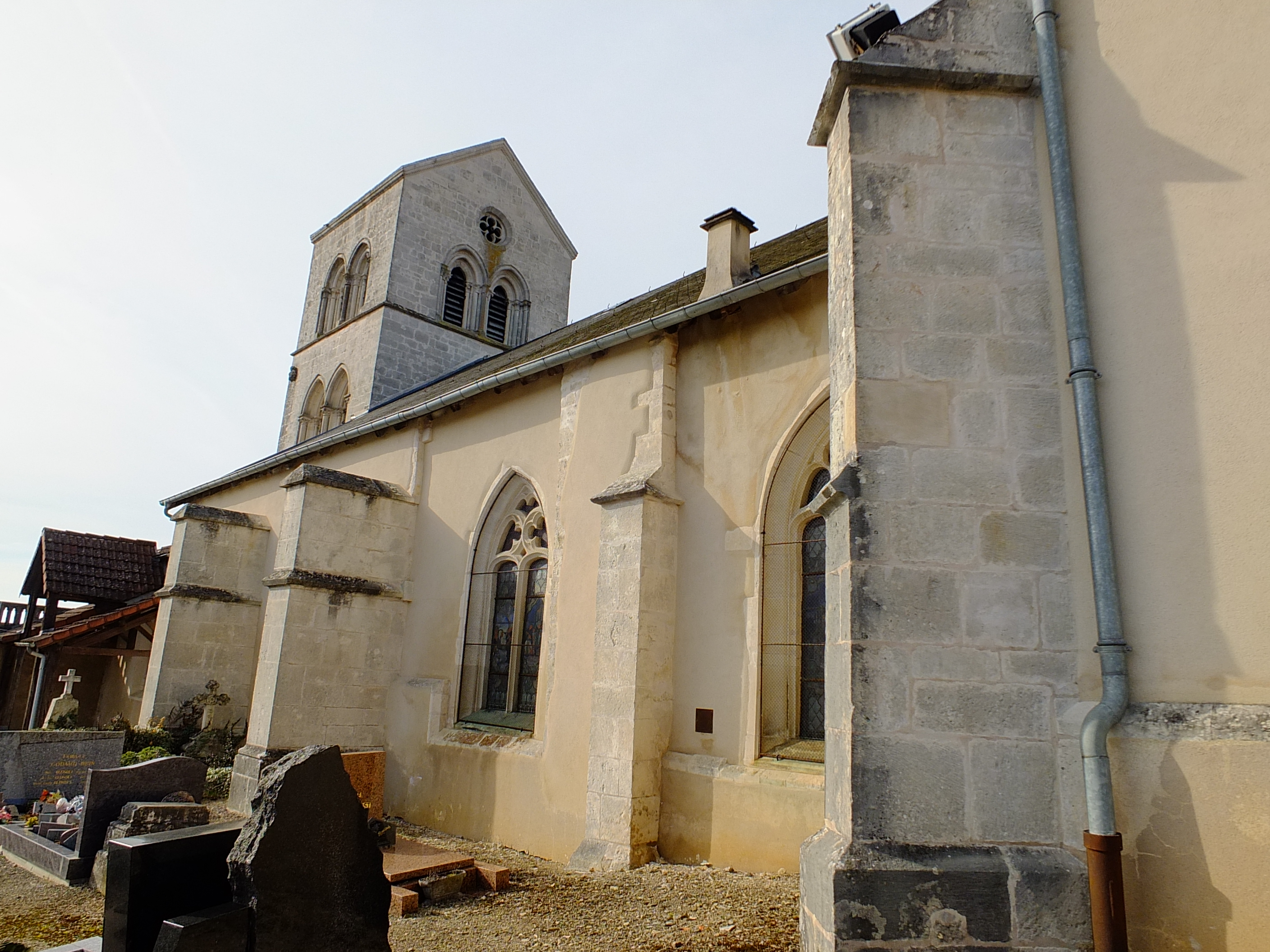
- The church in Soulosse-sous-Saint-Élophe

- Coat of arms
- Location of Soulosse-sous-Saint-Élophe
- Location within France Location within Grand Est
- Coordinates: 48°24′15″N 5°44′03″E
- Country: France
- Region: Grand Est
- Department: Vosges
- Arrondissement: Neufchâteau
- Canton: Neufchâteau
- Intercommunality: CC l'Ouest Vosgien

Government
  - Mayor (2020–2026): Vincent Kinzelin
- Area^{1}: 19.32 km^{2} (7.46 sq mi)
- Elevation: 291 m (955 ft)
- Highest elevation: 445 m (1,460 ft)
- Lowest elevation: 272 m (892 ft)
- Population (2023): 649
  - Density: 33.6/km^{2} (87.0/sq mi)
- Time zone: UTC+01:00 (CET)
  - Summer (DST): UTC+02:00 (CEST)
- INSEE/Postal code: 88460 /88630
- ^{1} French Land Register data, which excludes lakes, ponds, glaciers > 1 km^{2} (0.386 sq mi or 247 acres) and river estuaries.

Soulosse-sous-Saint-Élophe (French pronunciation: [sulɔs su sɛ̃.t‿elɔf]) is a commune in the Vosges department in Grand Est in northeastern France.

== See also ==
- Communes of the Vosges department
