= Recueil des inscriptions gauloises =

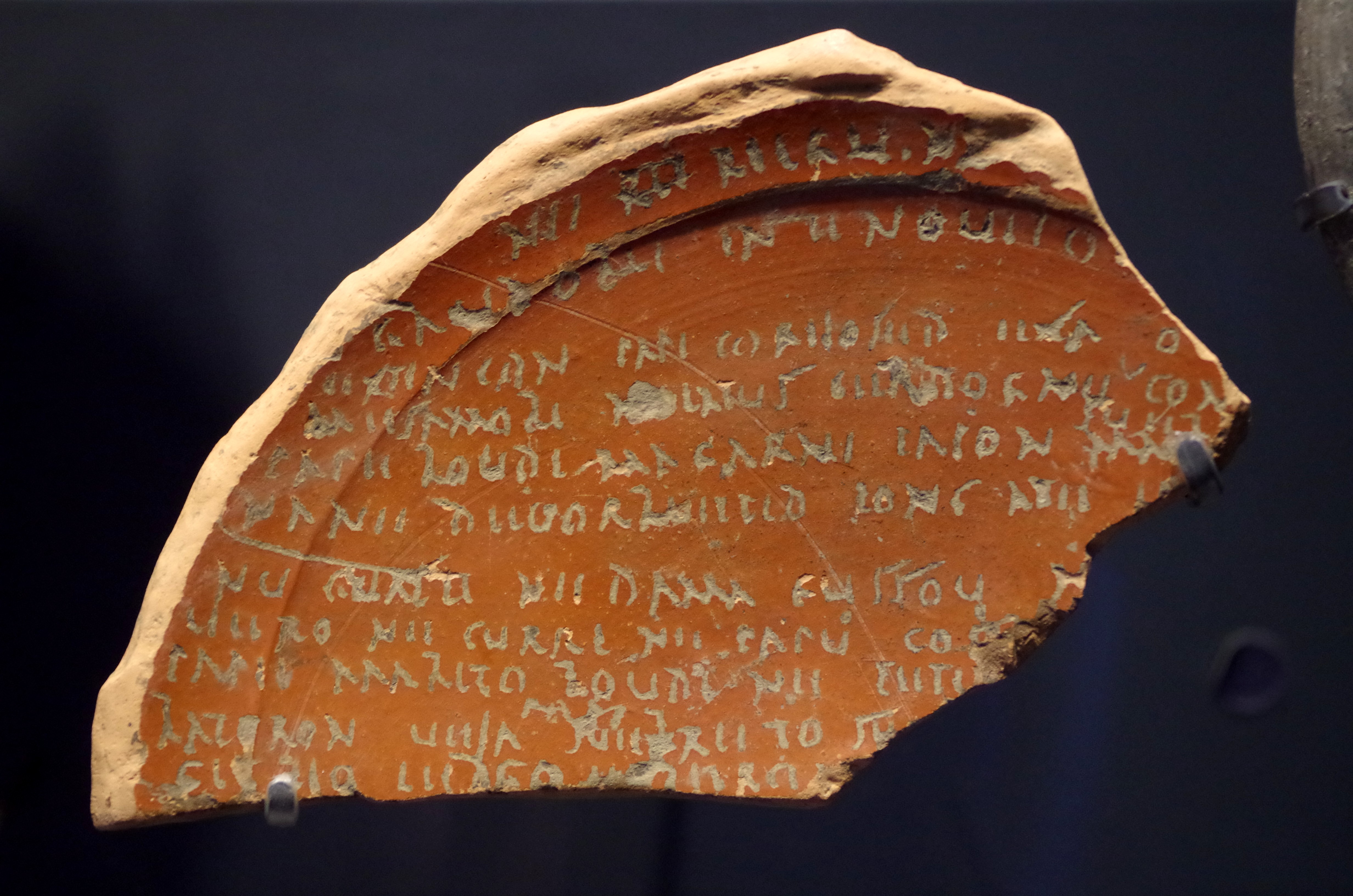
The Lezoux Plate — RIG L-66

The Recueil des inscriptions gauloises (RIG) is a comprehensive collection of Gaulish-language inscriptions. The RIG gives archaeological context, readings, commentary, proposed translations, and images for each Gaulish inscription. Inscriptions of only one word are usually excluded. The inscriptions collected date between the 2nd century BCE and the 4th century CE.

Each inscription is given a letter (L, E, or G, depending on whether the inscription is written in the Latin, Etruscan or Greek alphabet) and a number (e.g., G-159, L-3). Exceptions to this system include RIG III A and RIG III B, the Coligny and Villards-d'Héria calendars, which take up their own volume; and the inscriptions on coins in RIG IV, which are just given numbers.

The project was first announced by Paul-Marie Duval in 1959. The first volume was published in 1985 by Michel Lejeune. After Lejeune, the project was taken over by Pierre-Yves Lambert. The last volume of the series was published in 2002. A number of supplements to the volumes have been published in Études celtiques. In 2020, a computerised version of the RIG was begun, the Recueil informatisé des inscriptions gauloises (RIIG). The RIIG has an updated numbering system.

== Volumes ==
- RIG I: Lejeune, Michel (1985). Recueil des inscriptions gauloises. I, Textes gallo-grecs. Paris: Éd. du CNRS. — Gallo-Greek inscriptions (from G-1 to G-281). With several supplements, which start their numbering from G-501:
  - Lejeune, Michel (1988). "Compléments gallo-grecs" Études celtiques 25: 79-106. — G-501 to G-523.
  - Lejeune, Michel (1990). "Compléments gallo-grecs" Études celtiques 27: 175-177. — G-524 to G-525.
  - Lejeune, Michel (1994). "Compléments gallo-grecs" Études celtiques 30: 181-189. — G-526 to G-528.
  - Lejeune, Michel (1995). "Compléments gallo-grecs" Études celtiques 31: 99-113. — G-529 to G-555.
  - Lejeune, Michel; Lambert, Pierre-Yves (1996) "Compléments gallo-grecs" Études celtiques 32: 131-137. — G-556.
  - Lambert, Pierre-Yves. (2003). "Les inscriptions gallo-grecques parues depuis les Textes gallo-grecs de Michel Lejeune (1985)" Études celtiques 35, 2003. pp. 169-179. — G-557 to G-620
- RIG II.1: Lejeune, Michel (1988). Recueil des inscriptions gauloises. II, fasc. 1, Textes gallo-étrusques, textes gallo-latins sur pierre. Paris: Éd. du CNRS. — Gallo-Etruscan inscriptions (E-1 to E-6) and Gallo-Latin inscriptions on stone monuments (L-1 to L-16)
- RIG II.2: Lambert, Pierre-Yves (2002). Recueil des inscriptions gauloises. II, fasc. 2, Textes gallo-latins sur instrumentum. Paris: Éd. du CNRS. — Gallo-Latin inscriptions on instrumentum and other mobile objects (alongside wall graffiti) (L-18 to L-139)
  - Lambert, Pierre-Yves (2008). "RIG II.2: Notes de compléments" Études celtiques 36: 103-113 — Supplement to RIG II.2, containing L-140 and L-141.
- RIG III: Duval, Paul-Marie; Pinault, Georges (1986). Recueil des inscriptions gauloises III, Coligny, Villards d'Héria. Les Calendriers. Paris: Éd. du CNRS. — The Coligny calendar (A) and Villards-d'Héria calendar (B).
- RIG IV: Colbert de Beaulieu, Jean-Baptiste; Fischer, Brigitte (1998). Recueil des inscriptions gauloises. IV, Les légendes monétaires. Paris: Éd. du CNRS. — Gaulish inscriptions on coins (numbered 1 to 338).
