= Celtic astrology =

The term Celtic astrology may refer to

- Various systems of astrology invented by enthusiasts of Robert Graves Celtic Tree Alphabet, (ogham), see Celtic Astrology (Graves)
- hypothetical astrological systems of the prehistoric Celts, see Celtic calendar
