= Early Irish astrology =

Irish Astrology

It is unclear whether a form of Early Irish astrology existed prior to contact with Western astrology, as the earliest Irish language sources are simply translations from standard Western sources. Historian Peter Berresford Ellis argues that although there is evidence of the development of Irish astrology from the 7th century AD onwards, anything earlier is left to conjecture based on continental Celtic artifacts like the Coligny calendar and reconstructions from historical documents.

While the pre-Celtic megaliths in Ireland are often aligned with solar and lunar phenomena, no evidence has been found for the type of planetary symbol system as seen in other cultures' systems of astrology.

== Before Christianity ==
Peter Berresford Ellis has speculated on possible Indo-European connections between pre-Christian Irish astrology and Hindu astrology. The comparative research between the two astrological systems and their similarities, as well as their differences from Babylonian astrology from which modern Western astrology derives does not only concern these two systems alone. It implies the Proto-Indo-Europeans had a native system of astrology, which in turn, implies a native Indo-European cosmology which survived in these two cultures. He cites the works of Aibhistín, a 7th-century Irish astrologer as tentative evidence of a native system of lunar mansions similar to the nakshatras in Hindu astrology. Ellis has also hypothesised that the term Budh listed in an unnamed 9th century Irish manuscript in Wurzburg, defined as both "a point of fire" and the planet Mercury, is a cognate of Budha, the Sanskrit name for Mercury. Budh is also defined in Cormac's glossary as being "Aine's fire".

== After Christianity ==
=== Early Middle Ages ===
The introduction of Christianity into Ireland also resulted in the introduction of Hellenistic astrology to the island. During this period Ireland was known as a centre for the study of astrology and astronomy. Colleges run by the fili, or court poets were the main centres of study; however, monasteries were also centres of astrological activity. Irish chronicles written between 442 and 1133 show a high amount of accuracy regarding astronomical compared to continental sources from the same period. The appearance of the Crab Nebula in 1054 is listed on the same date as that which appear in contemporary Chinese and Japanese chronicles, while Italian sources list the supernova appearing 8 weeks earlier to coincide with the death of Pope Leo I. Aibhistín wrote extensively on the physical and supernatural properties of the Moon, being the first European writer to argue for an influence of the Moon on the tides, and as well as being the first to suggest that the Three Magi who celebrated the Nativity of Jesus were astrologers. An astronomical table spanning 84 years was cited by St. Columbanus during debates with Pope Gregory the Great over the Easter Controversy. Astrological charts in Ireland are recorded as going back to the 8th century, and in 814, the geographer Diciul wrote De astronomiam, a text covering both astronomy and astrology.

=== High and Late Middle Ages ===
Starting from the 11th century, Arabic astrology brought to Europe from universities led to a standardization of Irish astrology with Continental equivalents. Although Ireland between the 12th and 15th centuries was "a rich source of manuscript texts and books about astronomy and astrology", any trace of pre-Christian astrological systems had been erased at this point.

== See also ==
- Archaeoastronomy
- Celtic calendar
