= Michel Lejeune (linguist) =

French linguist

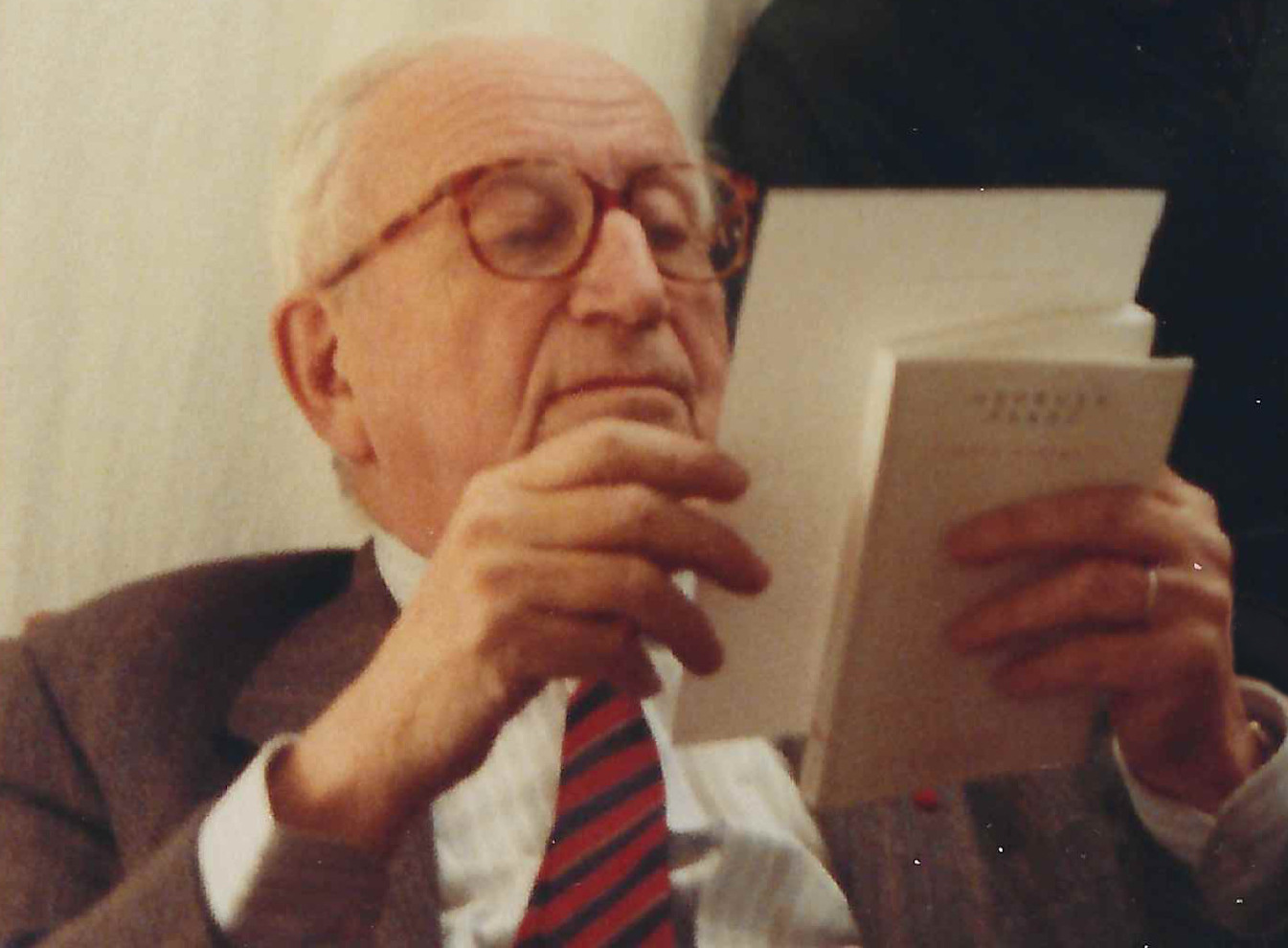
Michel Lejeune

Michel Lejeune (30 January 1907 – 27 January 2000) was a French linguist, a specialist in the sound changes of Ancient Greek. He was a member of the Académie des inscriptions et belles-lettres. He also edited multiple volumes of the Recueil des inscriptions gauloises.

== Biography ==
Michel Lejeune was born in Paris on January 30, 1907. Grandson of Xavier-Édouard Lejeune (1845-1918), who left behind his memoirs of “calicot” (published by Arthaud-Montalba, 1984), he was the brother of Arlette Lejeune, known as Bambi (1910-2006), and the cartoonist Jean Effel. At a very young age, he developed a passion for studying ancient languages: his first works date back to 1929. He entered the École normale supérieure in 1926, came first in the agrégation examination in grammar in 1929, and obtained a doctorate in literature in 1940. A linguist, he was a student of comparative grammarian Antoine Meillet and Joseph Vendryes. He specialized in the historical phonetics of Ancient Greek.

He taught successively at the universities of Poitiers, Bordeaux, and Paris-IV: lecturer in Greek and Latin philology (1933-1937) at the former, then professor of comparative grammar at the latter (1941-1946). in 1947 he became director of studies in comparative grammar of Indo-European languages at the École pratique des hautes études, then professor of linguistics at the Sorbonne (building) (1951-1955).

After 1945, he studied the languages of ancient Italy: Latin and Etruscan, but also Oscan, Venetic, Messapian, Elymian, and Lepontic. However, it was Linear B and its deciphering by Michael Ventris that mainly caught his attention. In 1954, he devoted one of his seminars to Mycenaean documents, language, and the structure of Mycenaean archives. He organized the first symposium on Mycenaean studies in 1956. For forty years until 1997, he published his findings on the subject each year in the Mémoires de philologie mycénienne. His study of Linear B led him to republish his Traité de phonétique grecque, incorporating certain Mycenaean data. As a historian of the Mycenaean period, he refuted several aspects of the thesis of the functional Trifunctional hypothesis.

He became interested in Gaulish at the end of his life. He published the Recueil des inscriptions gauloises (Collection of Gaulish Inscriptions).

In 1963, he became a member of the Académie des Inscriptions et Belles-Lettres and, from 1970, served as secretary general of the Société de Linguistique de Paris.

A renowned linguist and author of a synthesis on Language and Writing, Michel Lejeune died in 2000.

He is the father of academic Philippe Lejeune.
