= Lezoux Plate =

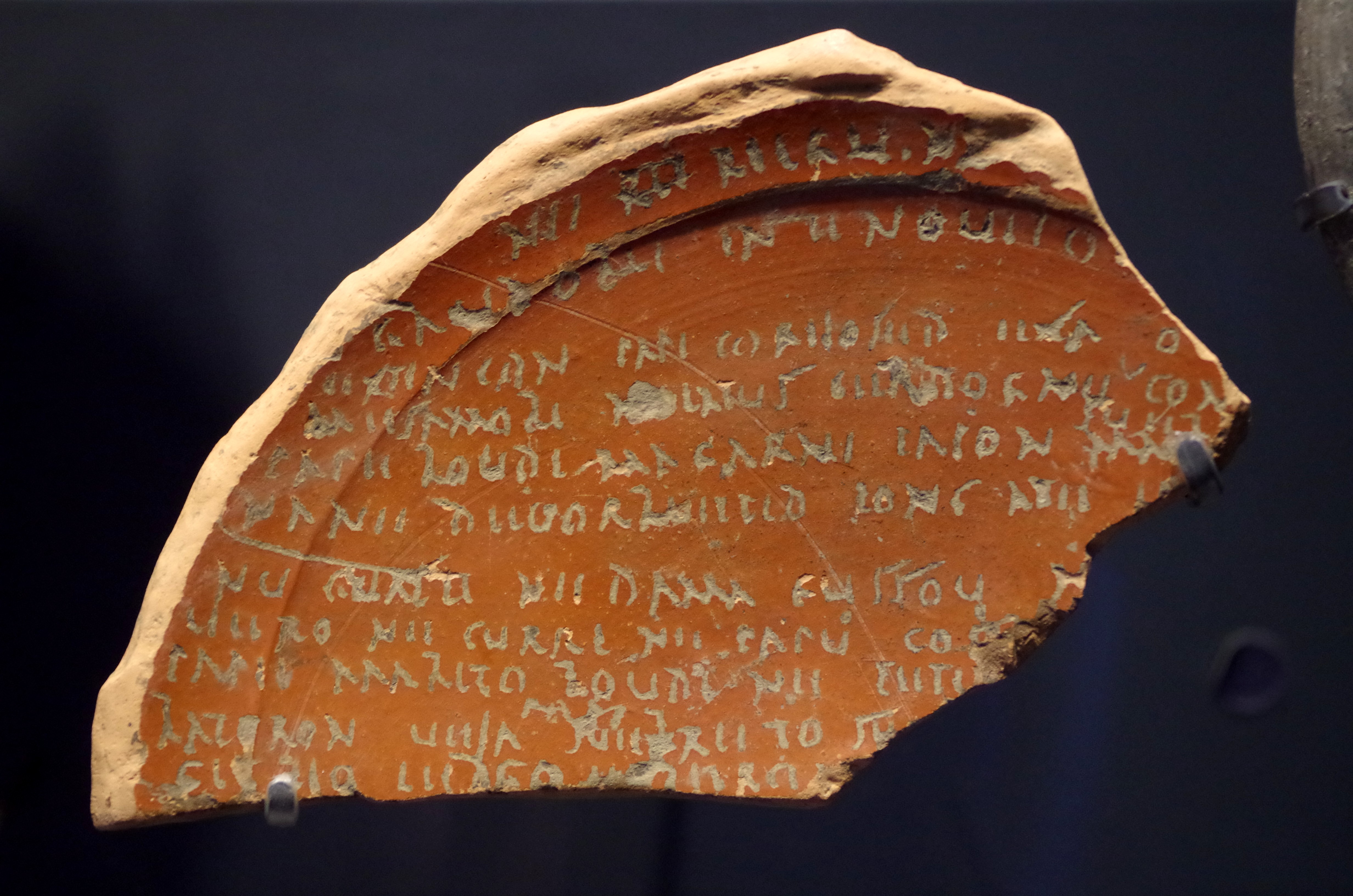
Lezoux Plate (musée de la Céramique de Lezoux).

The Lezoux plate is a ceramic plate discovered in 1970 at Lezoux (Puy-de-Dôme), which contains one of the longer texts in the Gaulish language (in a Gallo-Latin cursive script) which has yet been found. Since it is fragmentary, only parts of the text can be read, and only a fragment of that can be reliably translated. From those bits, it seems to be a list of aphorisms directed toward a young man.

mesamobi molatus certiognu sue-ticon
“praise (molatus = Old Irish molad “praise”) by the worst (mesam-bi with a dative plural ending, the root related to Old Irish messam "worse") (is) self-damaging to the righteous”

nu, gnate, ne dama gussou
“now, my boy, do not yield to violence” (?)

batoron ueia sue-breto
“one should go one’s way by one’s own judgement”.

The last form, -breto is likely related to Old Irish bráth "judgement" but the vowel is unexpected.

== Bibliography ==
- Xavier Delamarre, Dictionnaire de la langue gauloise, Ed. Errance, Paris, 2003
- Pierre-Yves Lambert, La langue gauloise, Ed. Errance, Paris, 2003
- Pierre-Yves Lambert, Recueil des inscriptions gauloises (R.I.G.).: Textes gallo-latins sur Instrumentum Éditions du Centre national de la recherche scientifique, 2002 - 1650 pages
- l'Arbre Celtique
