= Celtic calendar =

Compilation of pre-Christian Celtic systems of timekeeping

The Celtic calendar refers to the calendar systems used by ancient Celts to define the beginning and length of the day, week, month, season, quarter-day, and festivals. The Coligny calendar, manufactured in 2nd century CE Roman Gaul (modern France), is one of the most notable representations of a Celtic calendar.

== Continental Celtic calendar ==
The Coligny calendar is the oldest known Celtic lunisolar ritual calendar. It was discovered in Coligny, France, and is now on display in the Palais des Arts Gallo-Roman museum, Lyon. It dates to the end of the second century CE, when the Roman Empire imposed the use of the Julian Calendar in Roman Gaul. The calendar was originally a single huge plate, but it survives only in fragments. It is inscribed in the Gaulish language using the Latin alphabet and uses Roman numerals.

The Coligny Calendar reconciles the cycles of the moon and sun. The Coligny calendar considers the phases of the moon to be important, and each month always begins with the same lunar phase. The calendar uses a mathematical arrangement to keep a normal 12-month calendar synchronized with the moon and which keeps the whole system synchronized by adding an intercalary month every 2.5 years. The Coligny calendar registers a 5-year cycle of 62 lunar months, divided into a "bright" and a "dark" fortnight (or half of a moon cycle) each. The internal notations show that the months began with the first quarter moon, and a 13th intercalary month was added every 2.5 years to align the lunations with the solar year.

The astronomical basis of the Coligny plaque's calendar year may be far older than the plaque itself, as calendars are usually more conservative than rites and cults. The date of its inception is unknown, but correspondences of Insular Celtic and Continental Celtic calendars suggest that some early form may date to the earlier Iron Age. The Coligny calendar achieves a complex synchronisation of the solar and lunar months. Whether it does this for philosophical or practical reasons, it points to a considerable degree of sophistication.

== Medieval Irish and Welsh calendars ==
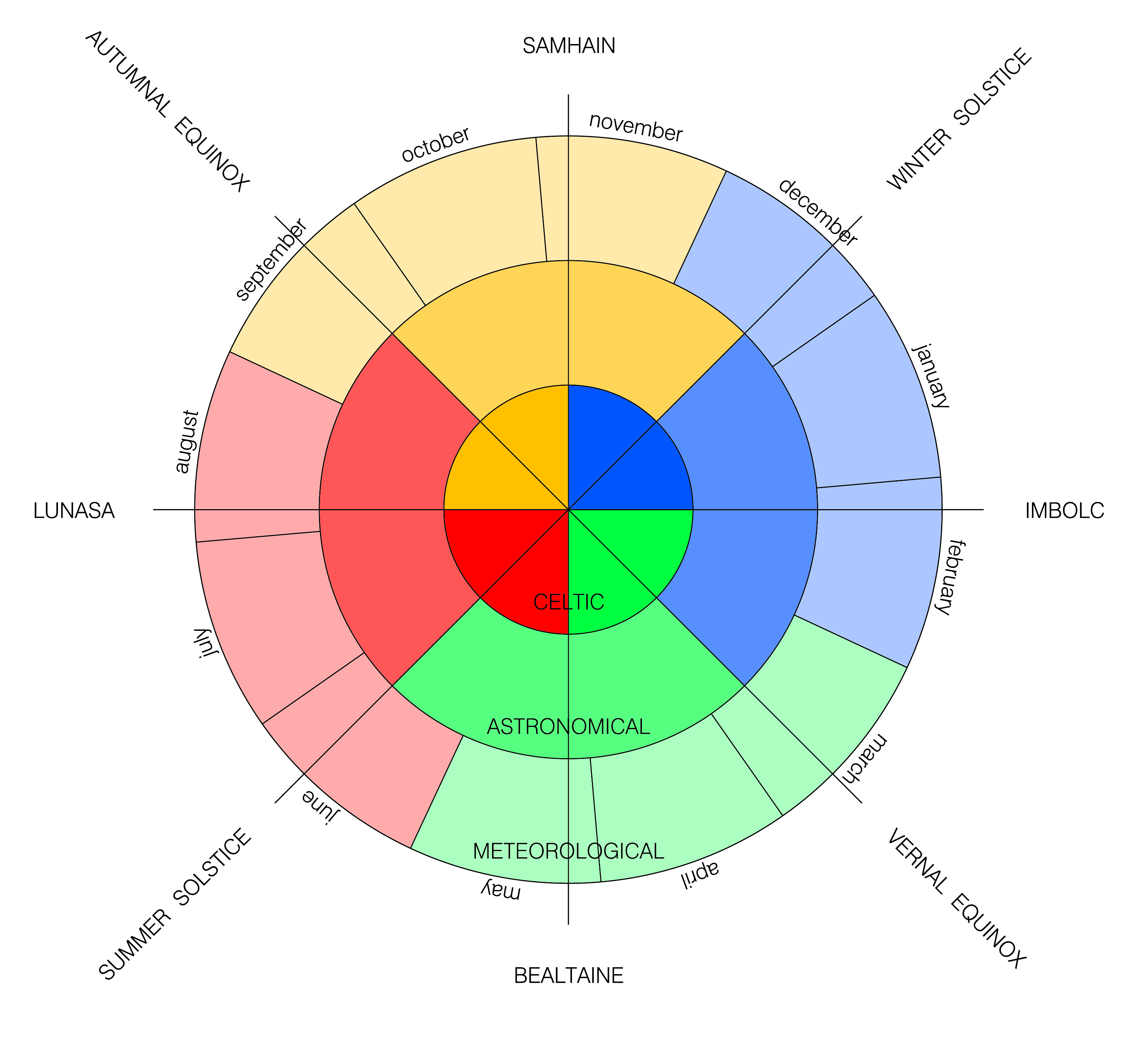
Diagram comparing the Celtic, astronomical and meteorological calendars

Among the Insular Celts, the year was divided into a light half and a dark half. As the day was seen as beginning at sunset, so the year was seen as beginning with the arrival of the darkness, at Calan Gaeaf / Samhain (around 1 November in the modern calendar). The light half of the year started at Calan Haf/Bealtaine (around 1 May, modern calendar). This observance of festivals beginning the evening before the festival day is still seen in the celebrations and folkloric practices among the Gaels, such as the traditions of Oíche Shamhna (Samhain Eve) among the Irish and Oidhche Shamhna among the Scots.

Julius Caesar said in his Gallic Wars: "[the Gaulish Celts] keep birthdays and the beginnings of months and years in such an order that the day follows the night." Longer periods were reckoned in nights, as in the surviving English term fortnight meaning two weeks, and the obsolete se'nnight meaning one week.

The Laws of Hywel Dda (in editions surviving from the 12th and 13th centuries) make repeated references to periods of nine days (nawfed dydd), rather than the "eight nights" that make up the current word wythnos.

== Native calendar terms in Celtic languages ==
Many calendrical and time-keeping terms used in the medieval and modern Celtic languages were borrowed from Latin and reflect the influence of Roman culture and Christianity on the Insular Celts. The words borrowed include the month names Januarius (Old Irish Enáir, Irish Eanáir, Welsh Ionawr), Februarius (Old Irish Febra, Irish Feabhra, Welsh Chwefror, Breton C'hwevrer), Martius (Old Irish Mart, Welsh Mawrth, Breton Meurzh), Aprilius (Old Irish Apréil, Irish Aibreán, Welsh Ebrill, , Breton Ebrel), Maius (Welsh Mai, Breton Mae), Augustus (Old Irish Auguist, Welsh Awst, , Breton Eost); the names for the days of the week, Solis, Lunae, Martis, Mercurii, Jovis, Veneris, Saturni; the terms septimana "week" (Old Irish sechtmain, Breton sizhun, Cornish seithun), kalendae "first day of the month" (Old Irish callann, Welsh calan, Breton kala), tempore "time" (Welsh amser, Breton amzer), matutina "morning" (Irish maidin, Breton Mintin, Cornish metin), vespera "evening" (Breton gousperoù "vespers"), nona "noon" (Welsh nawn, Irish nóin), and ôra "hour" (Irish uair, Welsh awr, Breton eur, ).

A number of native Celtic terms survived the adoption of the Roman/Christian calendar, however:

Term	Proto-Celtic	Gaulish	Old/Middle Irish	Modern Irish	Scottish Gaelic	Manx	Welsh	Cornish	Breton
Day / 24-hour period	*latyo-	lat (abbreviation, Coligny Calendar)	la(i)the	lá	là, latha	laa			
Day	*dīy(w)o-	(sin)diu "(to)day"	día; indiu "today"	dia, dé; inniu, inniubh, inniugh "today"	dia; andiu "today"	jee; jiu "today"	dydd; heddiw "today"; diwrnod "24-hour day period"	dydh; hedhyw "today"	deiz; hiziv "today"; devezh "day-period"
Night	*noχt-, *ad-akʷi-(?)	(decam)noct- "(10)-night"	nocht, adaig	nocht, oíche	nochd, oidhche	noght, oie	noson, nos	neth (comp.), nos	noz ; neizh-(comp.): neizhour (last night)
Week (eight nights/days)	*oχtu-noχt- / *oχtu-dīy(w)o-						wythnos "8-nights"		sizhun "7sleep"; eizhteiz "8-days"
Fortnight	*kʷenkʷe-dekam-noχt-		cóicthiges "15-(days)"	coicís	cola-deug (coig latha deug "15-days")	kegeesh	pythefnos "15nights"		pemzektez "15days"
Month	*mīns-	mid (read *miđ)	mí	mí	mìos	mee	mis	mis	miz
Year	*blēdā- / *blēdanī	b[l]is (abbreviation, Coligny Calendar)	bliadain	bliain	bliadhna	blein	blwydd, blwyddyn	bledhen	bloavezh, bloaz
Season, Period of Time	*am-n-, *amsterā-, *ratyo-, *kʷritu-	amman	amm, aimser, ráithe	am, aimsir, ráithe	àm, aimsir, ràith	imbagh, emshyr, emshir	amser, pryd	amser	amzer
Winter	*gyemo-	giamo-	gem, gemred	geimhreadh	geamhradh	geurey	gaeaf	gwav	goañv
Spring	*wesr-āko- "spring[time]", *wesn-tēno-, *ɸro-bertyā ("torrent, inundation")		earrach, robarta	earrach	earrach	arragh	gwanwyn (Old Welsh form: guiannuin)	gwenton	nevezamzer, amzer-nevez, digoramzer, digorhañv, beg-an-hañv
Summer	*samo-	samo-	sam, samrad	samhradh	samhradh	sourey	haf	hav	hañv
Autumn	*uφo-gyemo-ro- "under wintertime", *kintu-gyemo- "beginning of winter", *sido-[...] "deer-"[...]		fogamur	fóghmhar, fómhar	foghar	fouyr	cynhaeaf, hydref	kydnyadh/kynnyav, hedra	diskar-amzer ("falling season"), dilost-hañv, dianeost, dihaneost, dibenn-eost, diwezh-eost, rageost, dibenn-hañv, goañvhañv, razarc’h, kozhamzer, marvamzer, skub-delioù, gwenholo, here, kala-goañv
May, May Day	*kintu-samo-n- "beginning of summer"		Cétamain	Céideamhain	Cèitean		Cyntefin		
June, Midsummer	*medyo-samo-n- "mid-summer"		Mithem(on)	Meitheamh			Mehefin	Metheven	Mezheven
July	*uɸer-kʷenno-samo- "end of summer"						Gorffennaf		

== In Neopaganism ==
In some Neopagan religions, a "Celtic calendar" loosely based on that of Medieval Ireland is observed for purposes of ritual. Adherents of Reconstructionist traditions may celebrate the four Gaelic festivals of Samhain, Imbolc, Beltane, and Lughnasadh.

Some eclectic Neopagans, such as Wiccans, combine the Gaelic fire festivals with solstices and equinox celebrations derived from non-Celtic cultures to produce the Wiccan modern Wheel of the Year. Some eclectic Neopagans are also influenced by Robert Graves' "Celtic Tree Calendar", which has no foundation in historical calendars or actual ancient Celtic Astrology, instead being derived from Graves' extrapolation of The Song of Amergin.

== See also ==
- Coligny calendar
- Irish calendar (Gaelic calendar)
- Welsh holidays
