= Villards-d'Héria =

- Commune
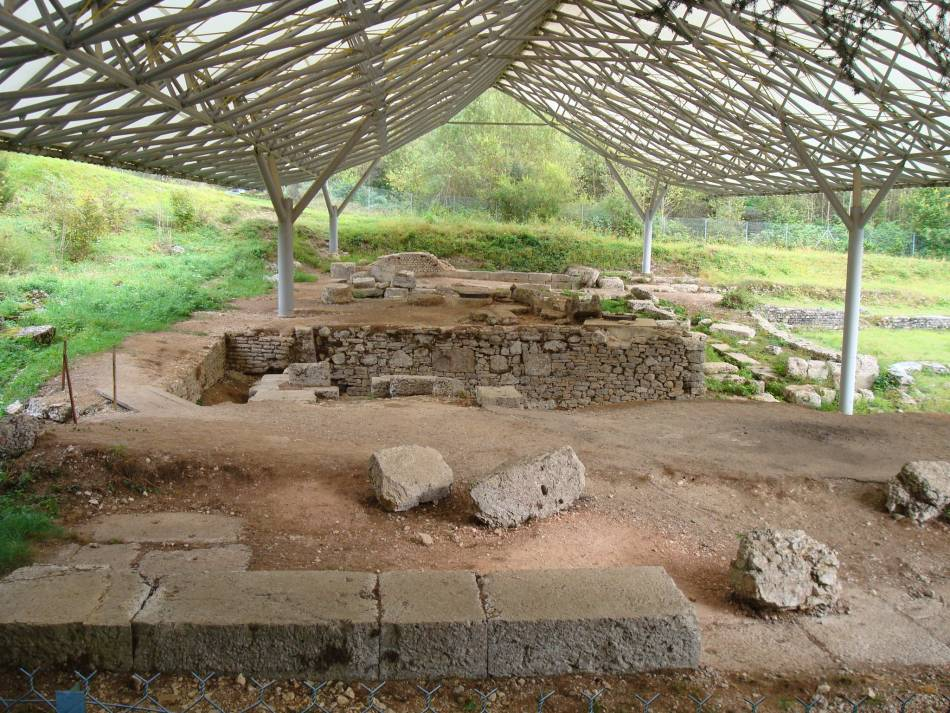
- Gallo-Roman archaeological site
- Location of Villards-d'Héria
- Location within France Location within Bourgogne-Franche-Comté
- Coordinates: 46°25′08″N 5°44′08″E
- Country: France
- Region: Bourgogne-Franche-Comté
- Department: Jura
- Arrondissement: Saint-Claude
- Canton: Moirans-en-Montagne

Government
  - Mayor (2020–2026): Jean-Robert Bondier
- Area^{1}: 9.91 km^{2} (3.83 sq mi)
- Highest elevation: 950 m (3,120 ft)
- Lowest elevation: 459 m (1,506 ft)
- Population (2023): 397
  - Density: 40.1/km^{2} (104/sq mi)
- Time zone: UTC+01:00 (CET)
  - Summer (DST): UTC+02:00 (CEST)
- INSEE/Postal code: 39561 /39260
- ^{1} French Land Register data, which excludes lakes, ponds, glaciers > 1 km^{2} (0.386 sq mi or 247 acres) and river estuaries.

Villards-d'Héria (French pronunciation: [vilaʁ deʁja]) is a commune in the Jura department in the Bourgogne-Franche-Comté region in eastern France.

Villards-d'Héria is the site of a Gallo-Roman sanctuary, in which the remains of bronze calendar similar to the Coligny calendar were discovered.

== Gallery ==
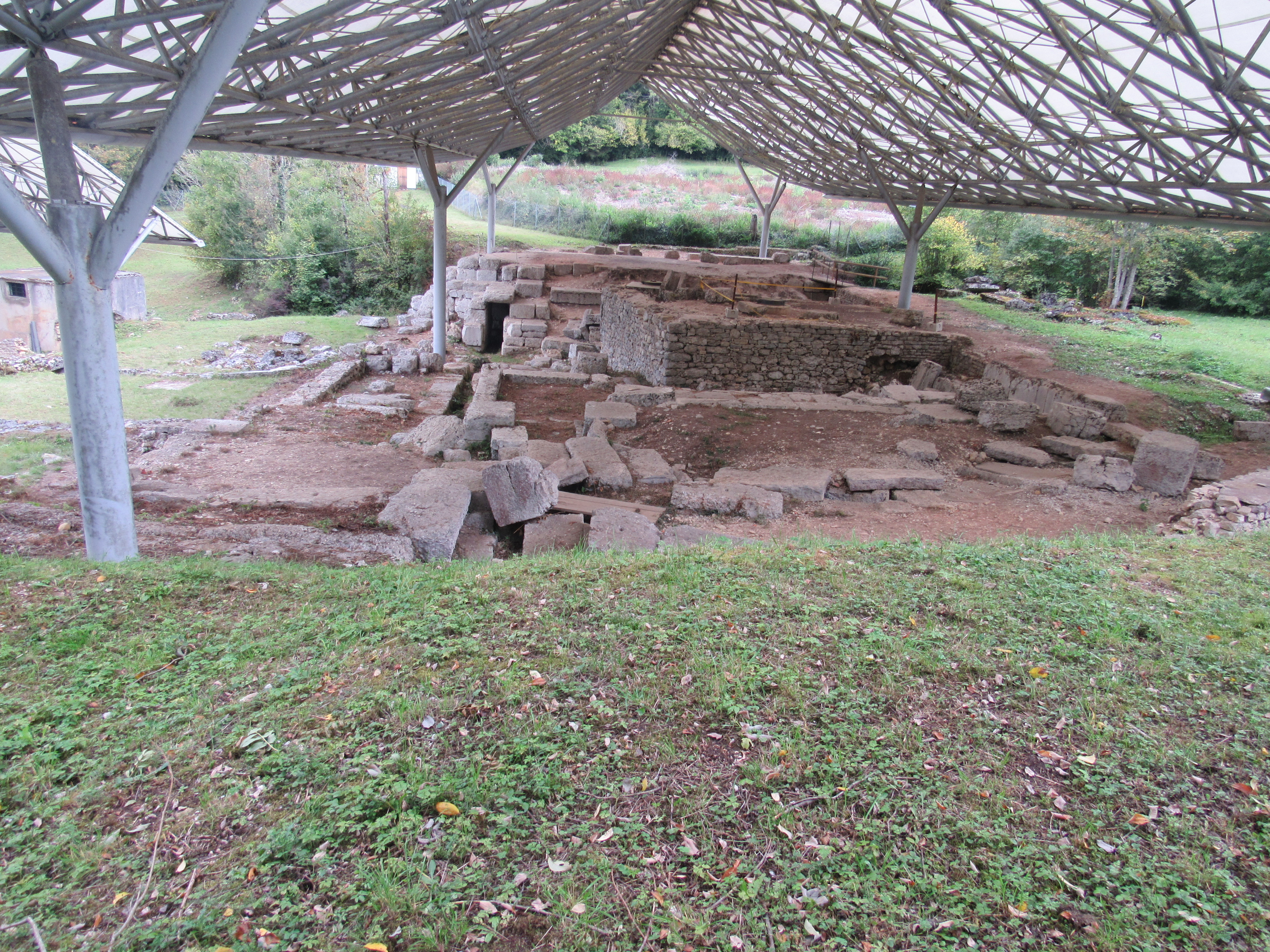
Ruins of the Gallo-Roman sanctuary

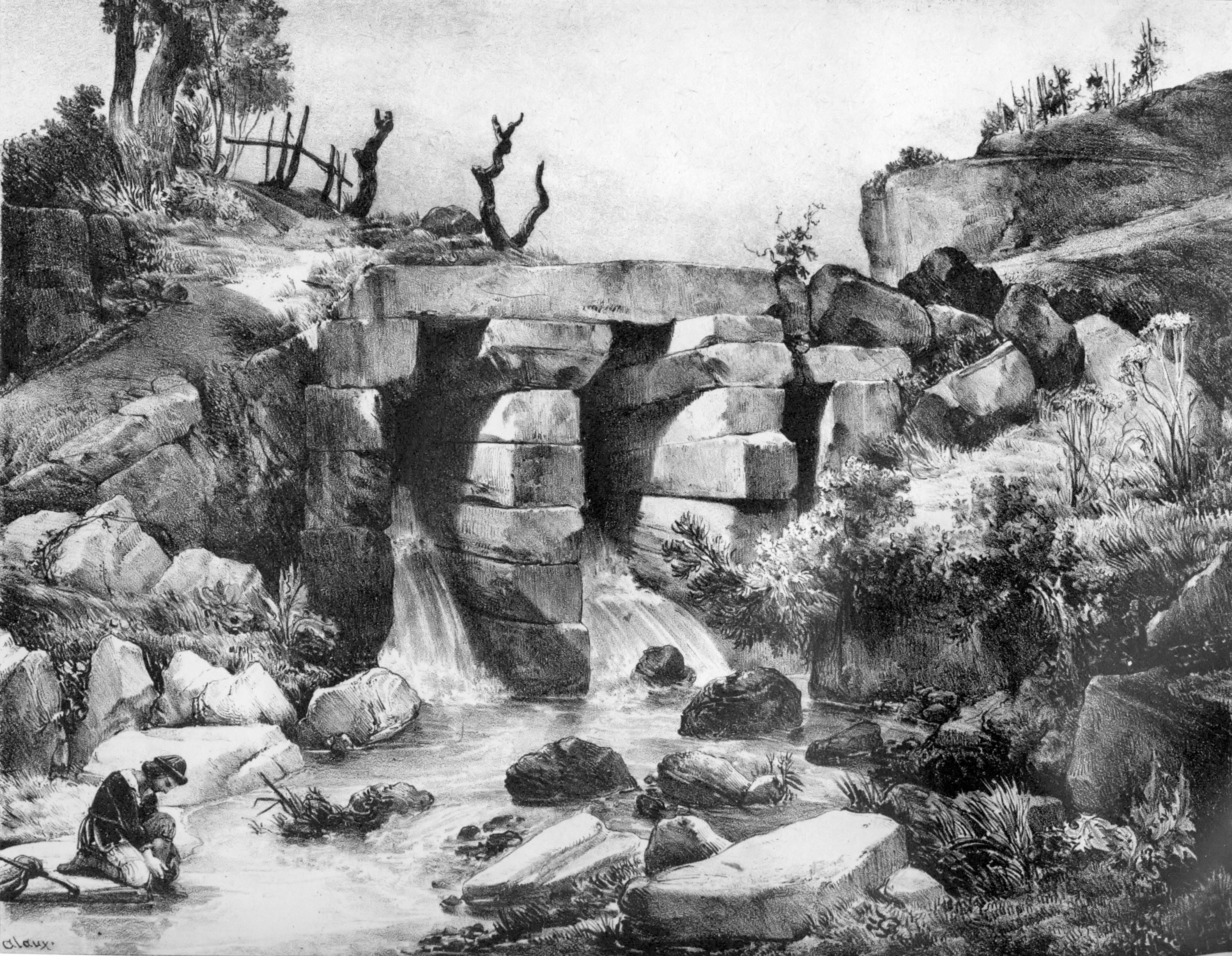
Gallo-Roman bridge at the sanctuary

== Population ==
Historical population
| Year | Pop. | ±% p.a. |
|---|---|---|
| 1968 | 341 | — |
| 1975 | 384 | +1.71% |
| 1982 | 392 | +0.29% |
| 1990 | 391 | −0.03% |
| 1999 | 476 | +2.21% |
| 2007 | 458 | −0.48% |
| 2012 | 443 | −0.66% |
| 2017 | 409 | −1.58% |
| 2023 | 397 | −0.50% |
Source: INSEE

== See also ==
- Communes of the Jura department
