= Coligny calendar =

Calendar found in Coligny, Ain, France, in 1897

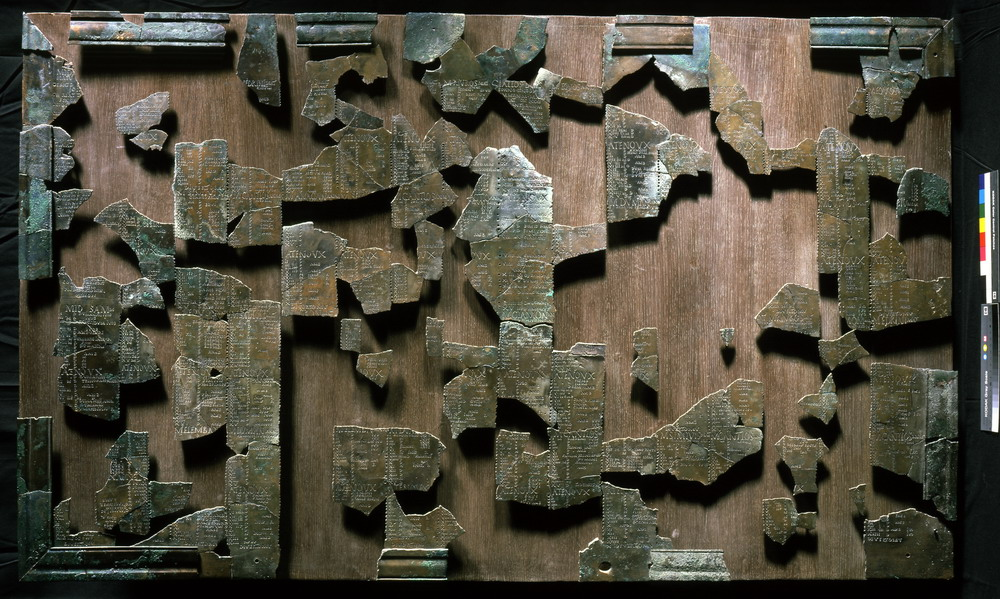
- Reconstruction of the Coligny calendar
- Type: Plaque, lunisolar calendar
- Material: Bronze
- Height: 78 cm (31 in)
- Width: 134.8 cm (53.1 in)
- Writing: Gaulish language using Latin script
- Created: 2nd century CE
- Discovered: 1897; Coligny, Ain, France
- Present location: Gallo-Roman Museum of Lyon-Fourvière, Lyon, France
- Culture: Roman Gaul

The Coligny calendar is a bronze plaque with an inscribed calendar, made in Roman Gaul in the 2nd century CE. It lays out a 5-year cycle of a lunisolar calendar, each year with 12 lunar months. An intercalary month is inserted before each 2.5 years. It is the most important piece of evidence enabling the reconstruction of an ancient Celtic calendar.

The calendar was found in 1897 in France, in Coligny, Ain (near Lyon), along with broken pieces of a life-size bronze statue of a nude male holding a spear, likely meant to portray Mars, the Roman god of war. Approximately 40% of the original calendar remains in the form of fragments. It was engraved on a bronze tablet, preserved in 73 fragments, that was originally 134.8 cm wide by 78.0 cm high. With the rim attached the plate measured 52 by 32 unciae Drusianae (2.75 cm to the uncia). It is written in the Gaulish language with the Latin alphabet, using Roman square capitals and Roman numerals. Based on the style of lettering and the accompanying statue, the bronze plaque likely dates to the end of the second century CE, although copying errors indicate that the calendar itself is much older. It is now held at the Gallo-Roman Museum of Lyon-Fourvière.

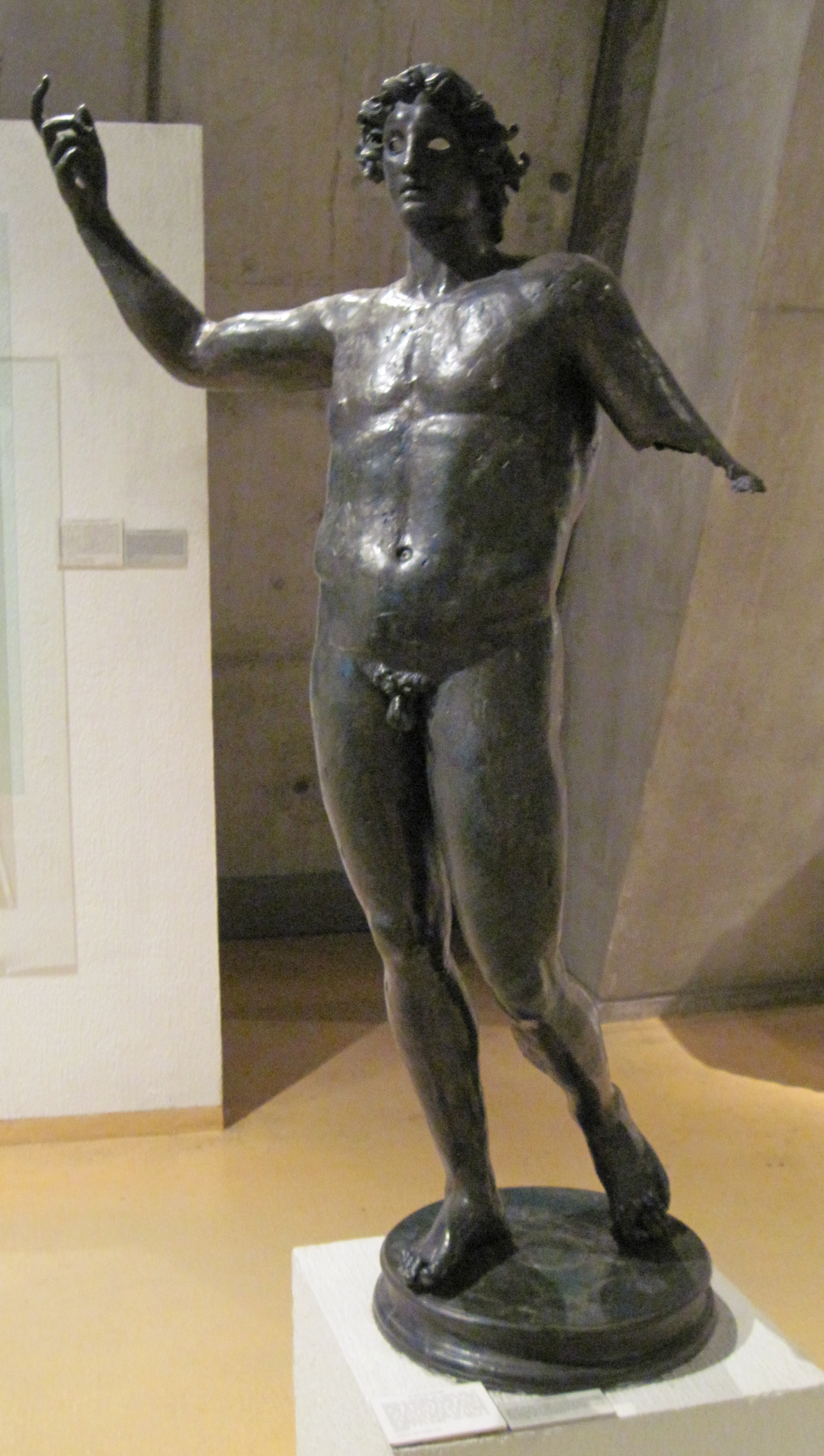
Bronze statue found with the calendar, possibly Mars, reconstituted by A. André.

Eight small fragments of a similar calendar were found at the double-shrine of Villards-d'Héria. It does not have the holes of a peg calendar that the Coligny calendar does, but otherwise has the same notations. It is now held in the Musée d'Archéologie du Jura at Lons-le-Saunier.

== List of months ==
The names of the twelve lunar year months are reconstructed as Samonios, Dumannios, Rivros, Anagantios, Ogronios, Cutios, Giamonios, Simivisonnios, Equos, Elembivios, Edrinios, and Cantlos. The names occur in the genitive form SAMONI, DVMANNI, RIVRI, etc. in the internal notations of the calendar. The name of the first intercalary month may be listed at the end of the month as QVIMON, possibly for Quimonios, the second is reconstructed as ...antaran, starting with either B, R or S.

Xavier Delamarre and Ranko Matasović state that Samonios comes from Proto-Celtic *samoni- "assembly, (feast of the) first month of the year", perhaps "assembly of the living and dead".

Samonios and Giamonios divide the calendar into summer and winter seasons of six months, each season led off by a festival of several days marked with IVOS. This indicates an early version of the same traditional seasons as seen in later Celtic contexts: "For two divisions were formerly on the year, viz., summer from Beltaine (the first of May), and winter from Samuin to Beltaine".

Allowing for variations between lunar and solar years and aligning the month names to the solar year's seasons, Samonios may have begun on the first quarter moon around May–June; if aligned to the modern Gaelic festivals Beltane, Lughnasadh, Samhain and Imbolc, Samonios might have begun around on the first quarter moon around April—May.

| Order | Name | Days | Etymology | Interpretation | | |
| Order | Name | Days | Etymology | Samoni | Solar | Gaelic Festivals |
|---|---|---|---|---|---|---|
| I-1 | Quimonios? | 29/30? | Unknown meaning | Sep-Oct | Apr-May | Mar-Apr |
| 1 | Samonios | 30 | P-Celt. samoni- "assembly, (feast of the) first month of the year" (cf. O.Ir. bech-samain 'bee-swarm'; M.Ir. samain '[assembly on] the 1st of November'). A link to Gaulish samo- ('summer') appears to be a folk etymology. | Oct-Nov | May-Jun | Apr-May |
| 2 | Dumannios | 29 | Potential cognate, Latin fūmus, P.I.E. dʰuh₂mós. Delamarre suggests "month of fumigations". | Nov-Dec | Jun-Jul | May-Jun |
| 3 | Rivros | 30 | O.Ir. remor "stout, thick, fat", W. rhef "thick, stout; great, large". Delamarre suggests "fat month". | Dec-Jan | Jul-Aug | Jun-Jul |
| 4 | Anagantios | 29 | From *an-agantio- (the month 'in which one does not travel'), *aneg-antio ('month of protection'), or *ad-nigantio- ('month of ritual ablution'). | Jan-Feb | Aug-Sep | Jul-Aug |
| 5 | Ogronios | 30 | Delamarre suggests "month of cold/winter". | Feb-Mar | Sep-Oct | Aug-Sep |
| 6 | Cutios | 30 | Delamarre suggests "month of invocations". | Mar-Apr | Oct-Nov | Sep-Oct |
| I-2 | [.]antaran | 30 | Unknown meaning | Mar-Apr | Oct-Nov | Sep-Oct |
| 7 | Giamonios | 29 | Gaulish giamos (Note: "L'étymologie est transparent puisque le nom du mois et fait sur celui de l'hiver giamo-." — Delamarre (2003): [The etymology is transparent since the name of the month is made on that of the winter "giamo-".]), O.Ir. gam and W. gaeaf "winter"; O.Ir. mí gam "November" in Sanas Cormaic., Compare gamuin "calf", of the same root. | Apr-May | Nov-Dec | Oct-Nov |
| 8 | Simivisonnios | 30 | Simi- "half" for "half the course of the sun"., or P.I.E. *wésn-ont-s, "spring" for "half-spring". | May-Jun | Dec-Jan | Nov-Dec |
| 9 | Equos | 29/30 | Possibly a month of horses or livestock. | Jun-Jul | Jan–Feb | Dec-Jan |
| 10 | Elembivios | 29 | Month of the stag. | Jul-Aug | Feb-Mar | Jan–Feb |
| 11 | Edrinios | 30 | O.Ir áed "fire, heat". | Aug-Sep | Mar-Apr | Feb-Mar |
| 12 | Cantlos | 29 | Delamarre suggests "month of chanting". | Sep-Oct | Apr-May | Mar-Apr |

== The lunar month ==
The Coligny calendar as reconstructed consisted of 16 columns and 4 rows, with two intercalary months given half a column each, resulting in a table of the 62 months of the 5-year cycle. Whether the 5 years of the calendar plaque is part of a Metonic cycle of 19 year or 30-year cycle, the full length of the calendar is still debated.

| Y1; IC1; 01 | Y1; RIV; 04 | Y1; GIA; 08 | Y1; AED; 12 | Y2; RIV; 16 | Y2; GIA; 20 | Y2; AED; 24 | Y3; RIV; 28 | Y3; IC2; 32 | Y3; EQV; 35 | Y4; SAM; 39 | Y4; OGR; 43 | Y4; EQV; 47 | Y5; SAM; 51 | Y5; OGR; 55 | Y5; EQV; 59 |
| Y1; IC1; 01 | Y1; ANA; 05 | Y1; SIM; 09 | Y1; CAN; 13 | Y2; ANA; 17 | Y2; SIM; 21 | Y2; CAN; 25 | Y3; ANA; 29 | Y3; IC2; 32 | Y3; ELE; 36 | Y4; DVM; 40 | Y4; CVT; 44 | Y4; ELE; 48 | Y5; DVM; 52 | Y5; CVT; 56 | Y5; ELE; 60 |
| Y1; SAM; 02 | Y1; OGR; 06 | Y1; EQV; 10 | Y2; SAM; 14 | Y2; OGR; 18 | Y2; EQV; 22 | Y3; SAM; 26 | Y3; OGR; 30 | Y3; GIA; 33 | Y3; AED; 37 | Y4; RIV; 41 | Y4; GIA; 45 | Y4; AED; 49 | Y5; RIV; 53 | Y5; GIA; 57 | Y5; AED; 61 |
| Y1; DVM; 03 | Y1; CVT; 07 | Y1; ELE; 11 | Y2; DVM; 15 | Y2; CVT; 19 | Y2; ELE; 23 | Y3; DVM; 27 | Y3; CVT; 31 | Y3; SIM; 34 | Y3; CAN; 38 | Y4; ANA; 42 | Y4; SIM; 46 | Y4; CAN; 50 | Y5; ANA; 54 | Y5; SIM; 58 | Y5; CAN; 62 |

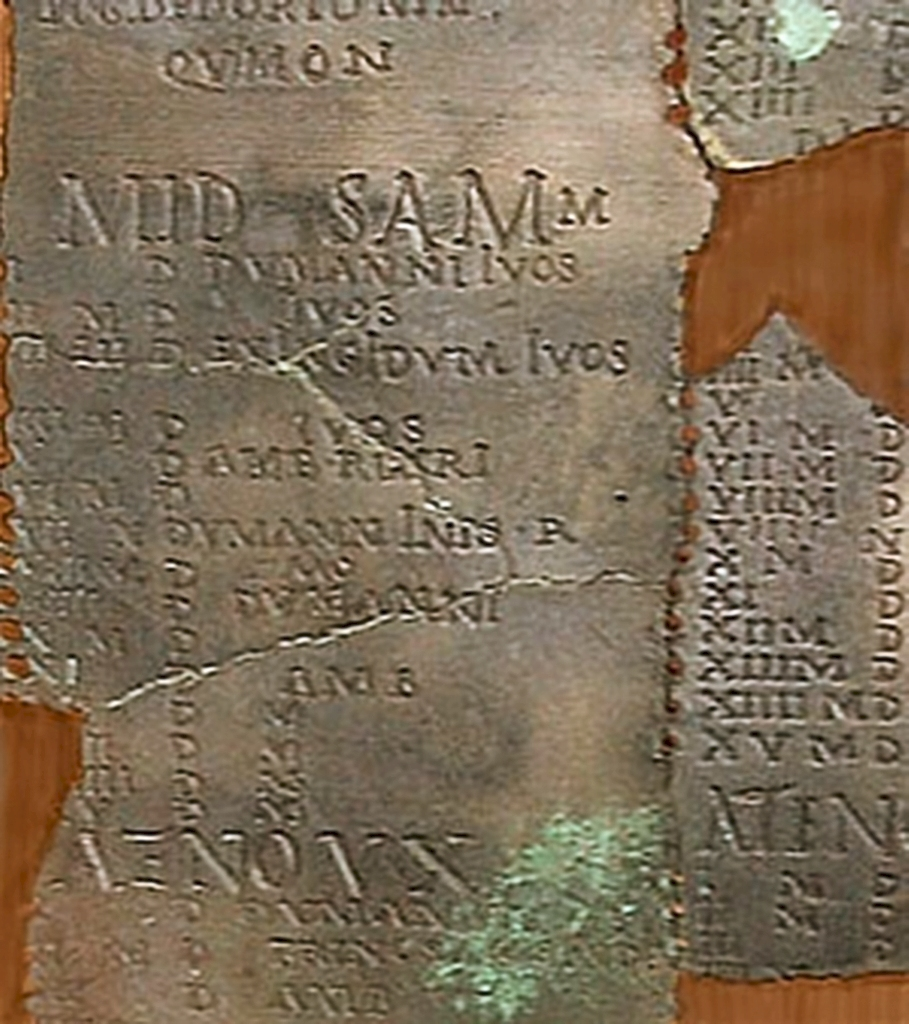
Detail of Samonios (year 1).

Each lunar year has 12 lunar months, six 30 day months, five 29 days months and a 29/30 day variable month. As synodic months are 29.53 days long, the calendar may overcome this by removing a day from a 30-day Equos month. (Note: Equos in years 1 and 5 is marked with 30 days; Olmsted notes the header above 2nd Intercalary month has LAT CCCLXXXV "385 days", with Equos in year 3 maybe having 30 days. With years 2 and 4 on lost fragments, early scholars struggled to fit values to Equos for creating a Metonic cycle; MacNeill suggested that Equos in years 2 and 4 may have only 28 days, while Olmsted suggested 28 days in year 2 and 29 days in year 4.) The length of Equos may have been decided by the sighting of the first quarter moon, which start months in the calendar.

The first intercalary month is in year 1 at the start of the year before Samonios, the second appears between Cutios and Giamonios in year 3 in the middle of the year. The second has 30 days, the first is contested on whether it has 29 or 30 days. Intercalary months have set copying patterns from days across the months throughout the 5-year cycle to form their day notations.

McKay proposes the first intercalary month had 29 days, as the "30th" day of a 29-day month Cantlos, in year 1 would copy DIVERTOMV, a non-existent day. Olmsted notes it may be 30 days stating it is marked as a MATV month, and the remaining portion of the broken-off second digit of the Roman numeral for the last day potentially has a slant for XV instead of XIIII.

== The start of the lunar month ==
Months are divided in two halves with ATENOVX (Note: Cf. Old Irish athnugud "renewal") between them. The first half has 15 days (Note: Cf. Old Irish cóicthiges "fifteen-days", Irish coicís "fortnight") and the second has 15 days or 14 days with DIVERTOMV replacing the 15th day as a 'virtual' day for notations.

Pliny the Elder reported Celtic months began on the 'sixth day of the new moon'.

The mistletoe, however, is but rarely found upon the oak; and when found, is gathered with rites replete with religious awe. This is done more particularly on the sixth day of the moon, the day which is the beginning of their months and years, as also of their ages, which, with them, are but thirty years. This day they select because the moon, though not yet in the middle of her course, has already considerable power and influence; and they call her by a name which signifies, in their language, the all-healing.

Classical writers counted days from the first visible moon, thus the 6th day would be close to the first quarter moon. When comparing the calendar's notations with Pliny's statement, the full moon would fall within days 7 to 9 and the new moon within 7a to 9a.

== Full reconstruction ==
A full reconstruction of the calendar by McKay (2020) includes the latest information about the intercalary notations and the triple marks. Olmsted (2001) offers a previous reconstruction, which usefully aligns the notations with photographic images. RIG III (1986) presented an earlier in-depth description of terms with a reconstruction.

=== As a cycle of 19 years ===
If based on a Metonic cycle, this can be created using four 5-year cycles with the first year of the first cycle dropped and Equos being 30 days long on Cycle years 1 and 5, with dates moving within a range of 36 days from a solar date.

Helen McKay's Metonic Reconstruction
| Year | | Month | | | | | | | | | | | | | |
| Met. Years | Cycle | I1 | Sa | Du | Ri | An | Og | Cu | I2 | Gi | Si | Eq | El | Ae | Ca |
|---|---|---|---|---|---|---|---|---|---|---|---|---|---|---|---|
| 05, 10, 15 | Y1 | 29 | 30 | 29 | 30 | 29 | 30 | 30 | _ | 29 | 30 | 30 | 29 | 30 | 29 |
| 01, 06, 11, 16 | Y2 | _ | 30 | 29 | 30 | 29 | 30 | 30 | _ | 29 | 30 | 29 | 29 | 30 | 29 |
| 02, 07, 12, 17 | Y3 | _ | 30 | 29 | 30 | 29 | 30 | 30 | 30 | 29 | 30 | 29 | 29 | 30 | 29 |
| 03, 08, 13, 18 | Y4 | _ | 30 | 29 | 30 | 29 | 30 | 30 | _ | 29 | 30 | 29 | 29 | 30 | 29 |
| 04, 09, 14, 19 | Y5 | _ | 30 | 29 | 30 | 29 | 30 | 30 | _ | 29 | 30 | 30 | 29 | 30 | 29 |

The Metonic Cycle, being 6940 days long, overruns the sun by 0.398396 days and the moon by 0.311620. This would require a 30-day Equos month reduced to 29 days around every 61 years to keep aligned with the moon. As the moon finishes roughly 0.0868 days ahead of the sun, the calendar will become a day ahead after 219 years, requiring a 29-day month skipped after 6,350 years or a 30-day month after 6,569 years.

=== As a cycle of 30 years ===
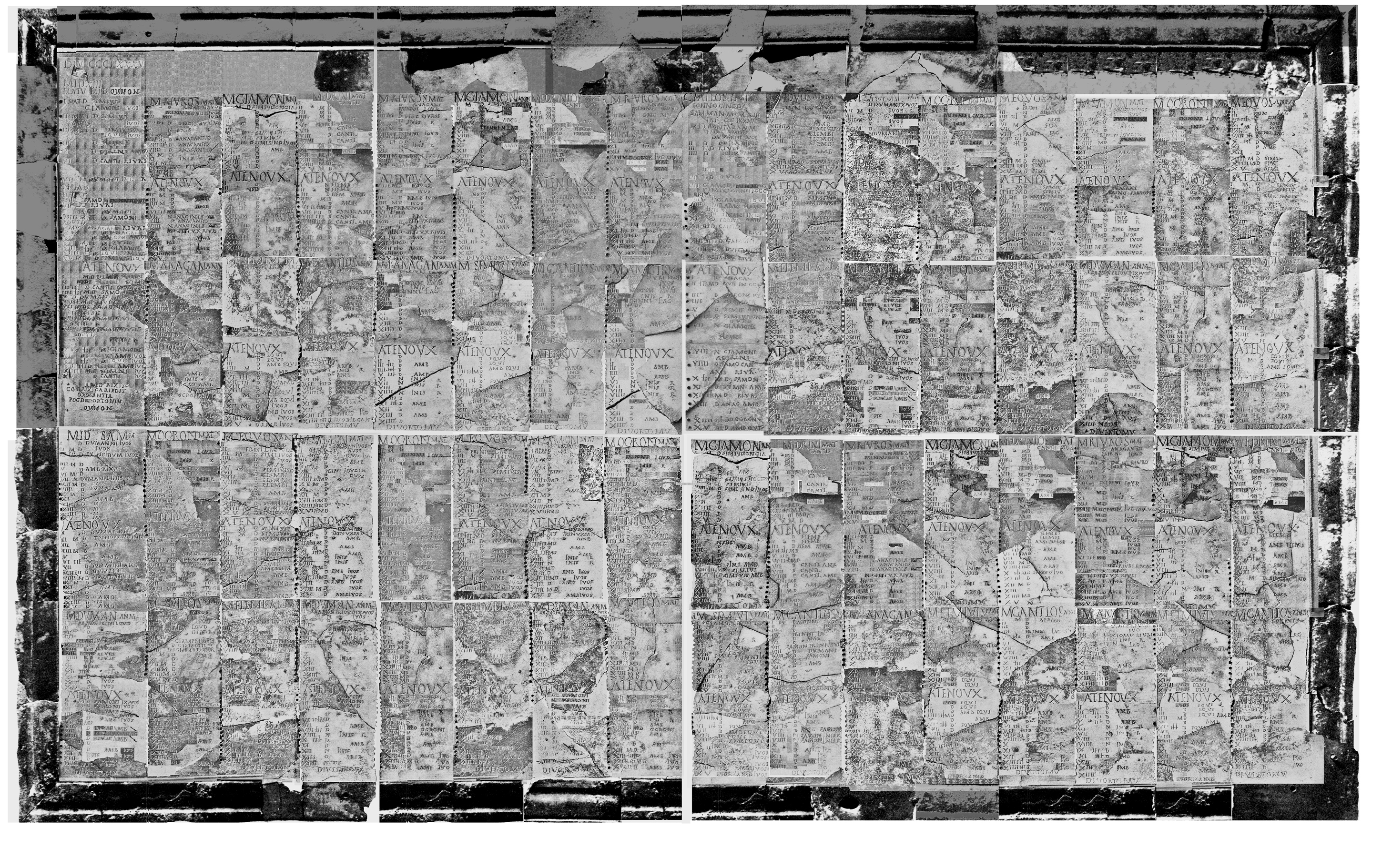
Garrett Olmsted's Reconstructed Coligny Calendar

The calendar can perform as a 30-year cycle, using six 5-year cycles with a 30-day intercalary month dropped once every 30 years. If part of a 30-year calendar, it overruns the lunar phase by 0.1515 days, requiring a day to be removed from a 30-day Equos roughly once every 198 years.

However, the internal months show a larger variation in accuracy for the lunar phase of nearly 48 hours (1.44 to −0.65), making the ability to track the lunar phase of 30-years notably less accurate. The lunar/solar difference is larger at 1.4172 days, requiring a 30-day month to be skipped every 198 years.

This relatively fast slippage against the solar year would also add to the already large lunisolar swing, for a total of 75 days before a possible adjustment, further aggravating the solar discrepancy, and displacing seasonal festivals by up to two and a half months.

== Sample month ==
The month of SAMONIOS in year 2 is the only month without any missing fragments, preserving all its notations. Most patterns of notations are known and can be reasonably reconstructed, (Note: The notations of days in a month are not always the same as the other years in the calendar and cannot be simply copied across other months.) though their purpose or significance is not fully understood.

The title starts with M declaring it as a month, followed by the name and its type, thus M SAMON MAT reads as "M(onth) Samon(ios) Lucky/Good". Days are sorted in rows, with ATENOVX "Renewal" dividing the month in two halves. Each day has four columns for the peg-hole, Roman numeral, triple-mark, day type and any additional notations. The M of day type appears in the triple-mark column.

The count for the days are in Roman numerals with additive notation, after ATENOVX, the count is reset. The triple marks have either no value, ƚıı, ıƚı or ııƚ; some have M after the triple mark or in its place, which is part of the following day's type. Day types are vertically aligned with D "day" or N "night". Day notations that provide further information on whether days were swapped, additional notations for day type or festivals. The PRIN LOVDIN notation spans across type and notation.

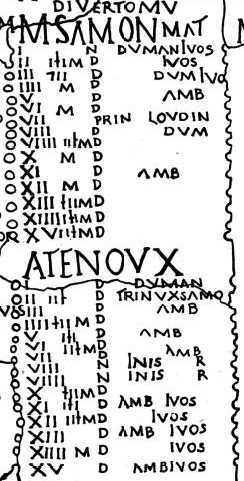
Drawing of month 14 (Samonios of year 2) by de Ricci.

M SAMON MAT
| I | | N | DVMAN IVOS |
| II | ıƚı M | D | IVOS |
| III | ƚıı | D | DVM IVO |
| IIII | M | D | |
| V | | D | AMB |
| VI | M | D | |
| VII | | PRIN LOVDIN | |
| VIII | | D | DVM |
| VIIII | ııƚ M | D | |
| X | M | D | |
| XI | | D | AMB |
| XII | M | D | |
| XIII | ƚıı M | D | |
| XIIII | ıƚı M | D | |
| XV | ııƚ M | D | |
ATENOVX
| I | | D | DVMAN |
| II | ııƚ | D | TRINVXSAMO |
| III | | D | AMB |
| IIII | ƚıı M | D | |
| V | ıƚı | D | AMB |
| VI | ııƚ M | D | |
| VII | | D | AMB |
| VIII | | N | INIS R |
| VIIII | | N | INIS R |
| X | ƚıı M | D | |
| XI | ıƚı | D | AMB IVOS |
| XII | ııƚ M | D | IVOS |
| XIII | | D | AMB IVOS |
| XIIII | M | D | IVOS |
| XV | | D | AMB IVOS |

== Calendar notations ==
Several different notations, each with their own pattern, are placed sequentially on the 12 lunar months of the calendar, interacting according to certain rules with the notations before them, often replacing them. After the basic notations are set, many days' notations are then moved to other days, creating visual chaos. Finally, the days of the intercalary months are filled with notations copied from certain days in the 12 yearly months.

The notations, their patterns and interactions have gradually over the last century been identified by several key researchers, and what follows is a general, but not comprehensive, overview of each notation.

=== Numbering the days ===
Each month has two halves. The first half has days numbered from I to XV (1 to 15). The second half has either I–XV (1–15), or I–XIIII (1–14) with the 15th day marked with DIVERTOMV. (Note: Because the day numbers are repeated in the upper and lower coicise, researchers use either the number with 'a' attached for the lower coicise, or continue on the sequence. For example, Day VI (6) in the lower coicise is given as either Day 6a or Day 21.) The term ATENOVX is placed between the two half-months. The patterns of the notations act as though the 30th day is always present. This means that in practice some months only have 29 days, but conceptually, all months have 30 days.

=== MAT and ANM months and their days ===
MAT and ANMAT months
| Summer | 1 | 2 | 3 | 4 | 5 | 6 |
| Summer | MAT | ANM | MAT | ANM | MAT | MAT |
|---|---|---|---|---|---|---|
| Summer | SAM | DVM | RIV | ANA | OGR | CVT |
| Winter | 7 | 8 | 9 | 10 | 11 | 12 |
| Winter | ANM | MAT | ANM | ANM | MAT | ANM |
| Winter | GIA | SIM | EQV | ELE | AED | CAN |

Six months are marked in their header as MAT "good, auspicious", and six as ANM[AT] "not good", based on comparisons with Middle Welsh mad and anfad and Old Irish mad and ni-mad..

The summer season has 4 MAT and 2 ANMAT months, the winter season has 2 and 4 respectively. MAT months have 30 days and ANMAT months have 29 days with the exception of Equos that can have 30 days in years 1 and 5.

Order of MAT and ANM months
Type
| Type | 1 | 2 | 3 | 4 | 5 | 6 |
|---|---|---|---|---|---|---|
| MAT | SAM | RIV | OGR | CVT | SIM | AED |
| ANM | GIA | EQV | ELE | CAN | DVM | ANA |

The order of the MAT and ANMAT months is determined by the seasons; MAT months start in Summer on Samonios and ANMAT months start in Winter on Giamonios. This order is used for determining the triple mark and PRINI LOVD/LAG notations across the days of the month.

MAT month days are initially assigned M D (or MD) "good/auspicious day", and ANMAT month days are initially assigned D "neutral day". The terms M D and D refer to daylight hours in apposition to N "night". Any notation with N overwrites the full daytime notation, including triple marks, M D, D and D AMB.

=== The notation D AMBRIX RI ===
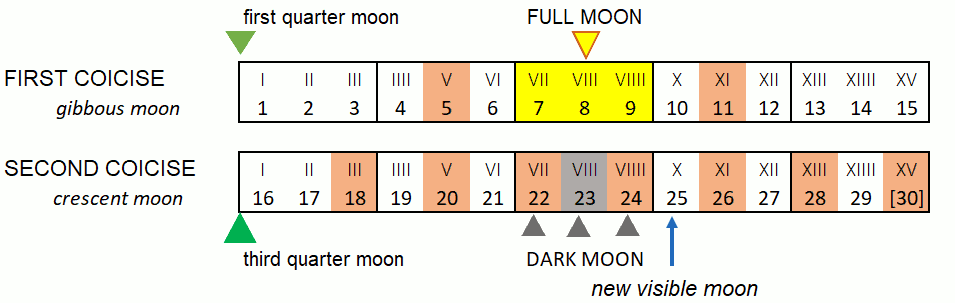
the D AMB pattern (orange) for a lunar month

D AMBRIX RI, usually shortened to D AMB, denotes an inauspicious day. It occurs only on Days 5 and 11 in the upper half-month, that being the period when the moon is more than half full, so it's mostly left free of inauspicious days. In the second half-month, D AMB is placed on every odd numbered day except Day 1, but this is explained by the traditional view that the unit 1 is neither odd nor even. (Note: unus non-est numerus sed ab eo crescunt numeri 'one is not a number, but numbers grow from it') The use of odd numbers as inauspicious is also seen with most months of 29 days being ANMAT 'not good'. It is symptomatic of Celtic cultures, as the Romans held the reverse view, that odd numbers were auspicious.

=== The triple marks ===
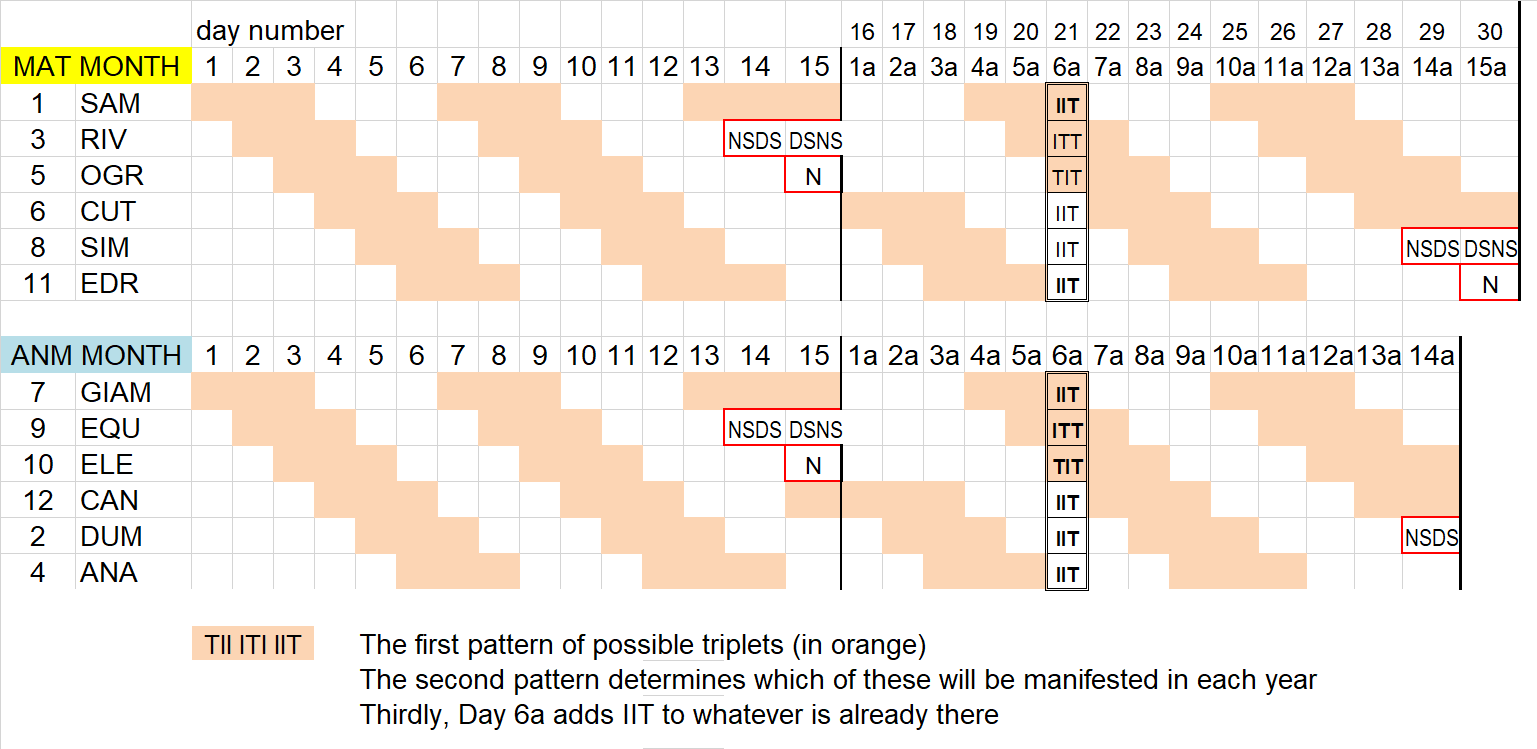
the base pattern of the triple marks

The triple marks are a series of ogham-like marks. They are first lain down each month in triplets over three days, ƚıı, ıƚı, or ııƚ, followed by three days with none. As they only occur with days marked with D (for daytime), and never N (for nighttime), they likely divide the daytime into three divisions. (Note: A trace of the pre-Christian division of the day into three may be found here. For this is how Conchobor spends his time of kingship since he assumed sovereignty: as soon as he arises, settling the cares and business of the province, thereafter dividing the day into three, the first third of the day spent watching the youths playing games and hurling, the second third spent in playing brandub and fidchell and the last third spent in consuming food and drink until sleep comes on them all, while minstrels and musicians are meanwhile lulling him to sleep.)

The triple marks are by far the most complex notations, composed of three main patterns. They do not always repeat across the years. The first pattern assigns possible triplet positions which start on the same offset as the first PRINI term in the month, moving down a day in each of the following MAT or ANM months. The first triplet starts on Days 1-2-3 of SAMONIOS in Year 1, Days 2-3-4 in RIVROS, and so on following the MAT sequence of months. The equivalent sequence starts on Days 1-2-3 of GIAMONIOS in Year 3 and follows the ANM months, so mirroring one intercalary period to the other.

A second pattern, again following the MAT/ANM sequence, determines which triplets of the first pattern will manifest from year to year. This means the triple mark on a day/month of one year may not be found on the same day/month in another year.

A third pattern adds another IIT on Day 21(6a), the last day of the visible moon, adding to another mark if already there, resulting in each Day 21 holding either TIT, ITT, or IIT.

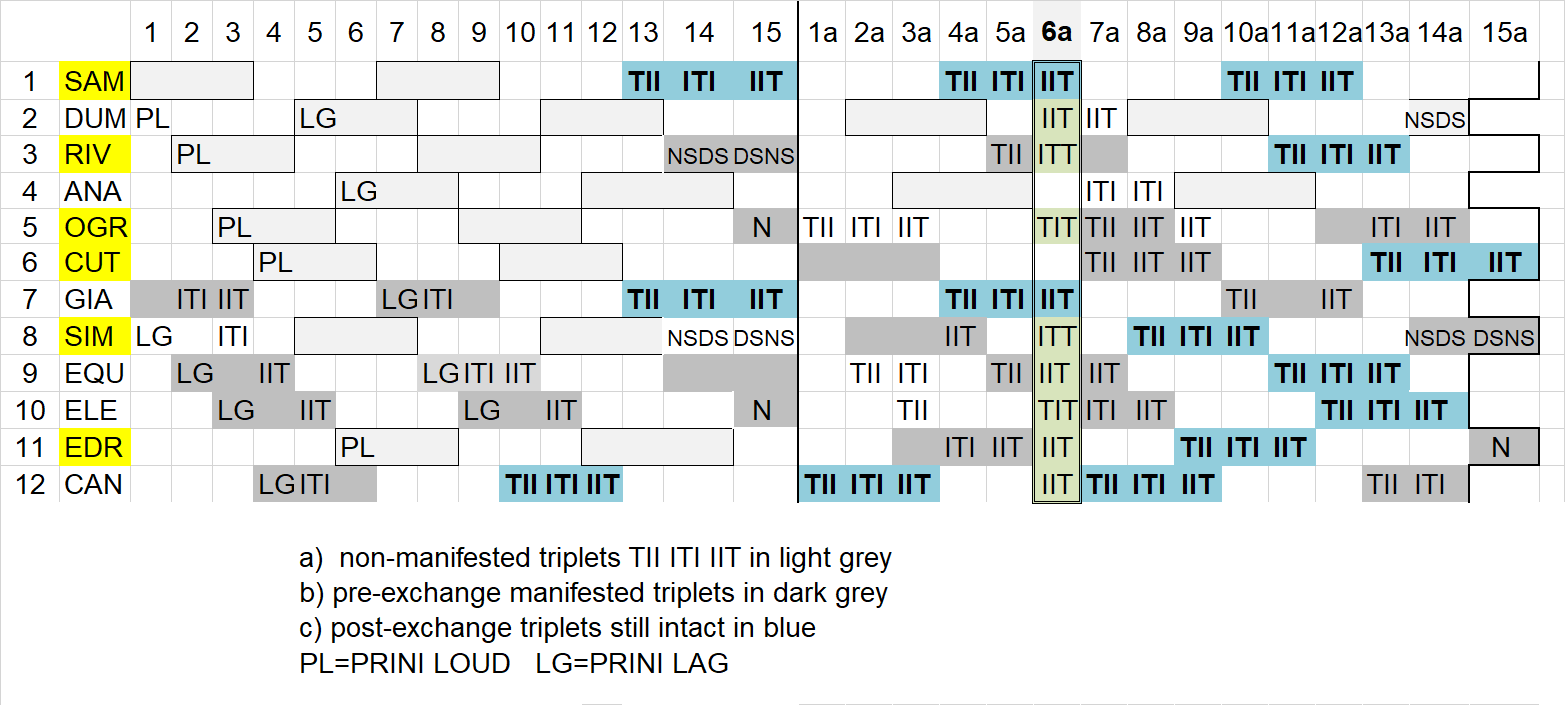
the final triple marks of year 4 (after all exchanges)

The triple marks undergo many changes as other notations are added. Days with N forms of notation overwrite the whole 'day' notation, e.g. IIT MD becomes just N, while ITI D AMB becomes just N. Days are moved and exchanged, often overwritten and lost, intercalary borrowed days are marked with N, and so on. The result turns a complex pattern of triple marks into visual chaos. (Note: For a full explanation of the patterns of the triple marks, see McKay (2018))

=== The notations PRINI LOVD and PRINI LAG ===
| MAT Months | SAM | RIV | OGR | CVT | SIM | AED | SAM | RIV | - |
|---|---|---|---|---|---|---|---|---|---|
| PRINI LOVD Days | 1 | 2 | 3 | 4 | 5 | 6 | 7 | 8 | - |
| ANMAT Months | GIA | EQV | ELE | CAN | DVM | ANA | GIA | EQV | ELE |
| PRINI LAG Days | 1 | 2 | 3 | 4 | 5 | 6 | 7 | 8 | 9 |

Like the triple marks, PRINI LOVD and PRINI LAG have the same month offsets for MAT and ANM respectively. If it falls on a triple mark, it replaces it, along with any M D, D, or D AMB. The PRINI LOVD of SIM 5 is later overwritten by N INIS R. Exchanges will lead to some PRINI LOVD ending up in ANM months, and vice versa.

=== The notation N INIS R ===
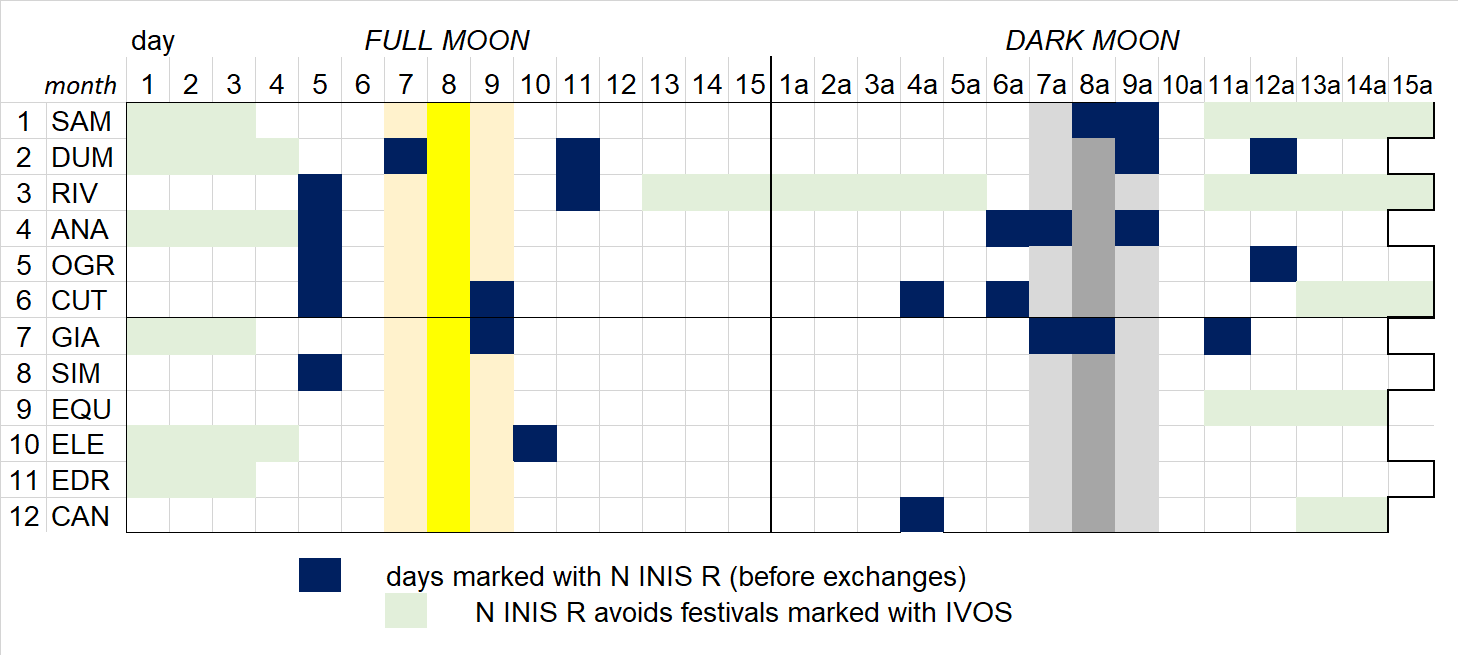
the N INIS R pattern

The term N INIS R is scattered across the lunar year. The significance of its distribution is undiagnosed. All but three instances occur in the seven months of the SAMONIOS season plus the month of GIAMONIOS. It avoids the days marked with IVOS 'festival'. As it occurs on seven nights when the moon is absent in the sky (the dark moon of 7a-8a-9a), and avoids the critical moments of the full moon of day 8 and the first visible moon of day 10a, it possibly refers to prognostication associated with stars.

=== The notations IVOS and SINDIV IVOS ===
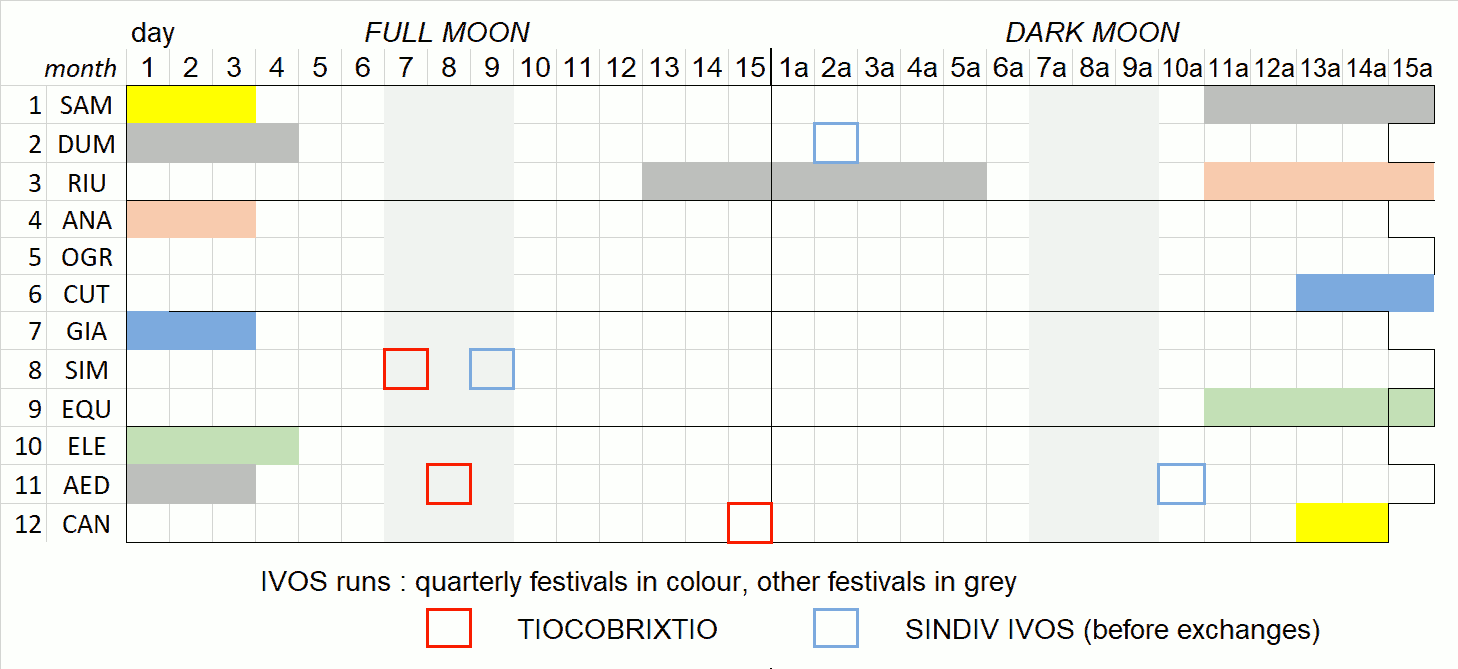
the notations IVOS, SINDIV IVOS, and TIOCOBRIXTIO

The term IVOS 'festival' (Note: Thurneysen (1899) suggested IVOS means "festival", although the etymology is obscure. The word ivos is also the Celtic word for "yew" – Rhys (1910), cf. Ivo, īwaz, and Zavaroni suggested a meaning of "(con)junction", but neither meaning has found wide support.) occurs in several runs of days of between three and nine days each, considered to mark each day of a festival. In all but two cases these festivals run from the end of one month into the beginning of the next. Four of these IVOS runs break the year into four-quarters, just as the four main Celtic festivals do in historic times, only here they are centered on Day 1 every three lunar months, rather than Day 1 of every three solar months as today.

There are also three other IVOS festivals on the calendar.

The term SINDIV IVOS 'this day a festival', occurs only three times – DVM 2a, SIM 9, and AED 25. These three special festival days must indicate something of exceptional importance in the year.

=== The notation TIOCOBRIXTIO ===
TIOCOBRIXTIO is an exceptional term which only occurs on three days in the year – SIM 7, AED 8, and CAN 15. Whatever its significance, it marks days of exceptional importance. Olmsted explains it could be read as T(R)IOCO(NT)O-BRIXTIO "A day in place day 30", possibly substituting for the missing day 30 of Cantlos.

=== Movement of notations between days ===
At this point, most notations have been assigned their base position on the calendar. What happens next is a major feature of the calendar, the movement of one day's notations to a different day. This visually breaks up the patterns of the notations, making the calendar seem quite random. This exchanging of days according to several different patterns, is a major aspect of the calendar, involving a total of 870 days over 5 years.

==== EXCHANGES: swapping notations between two days ====
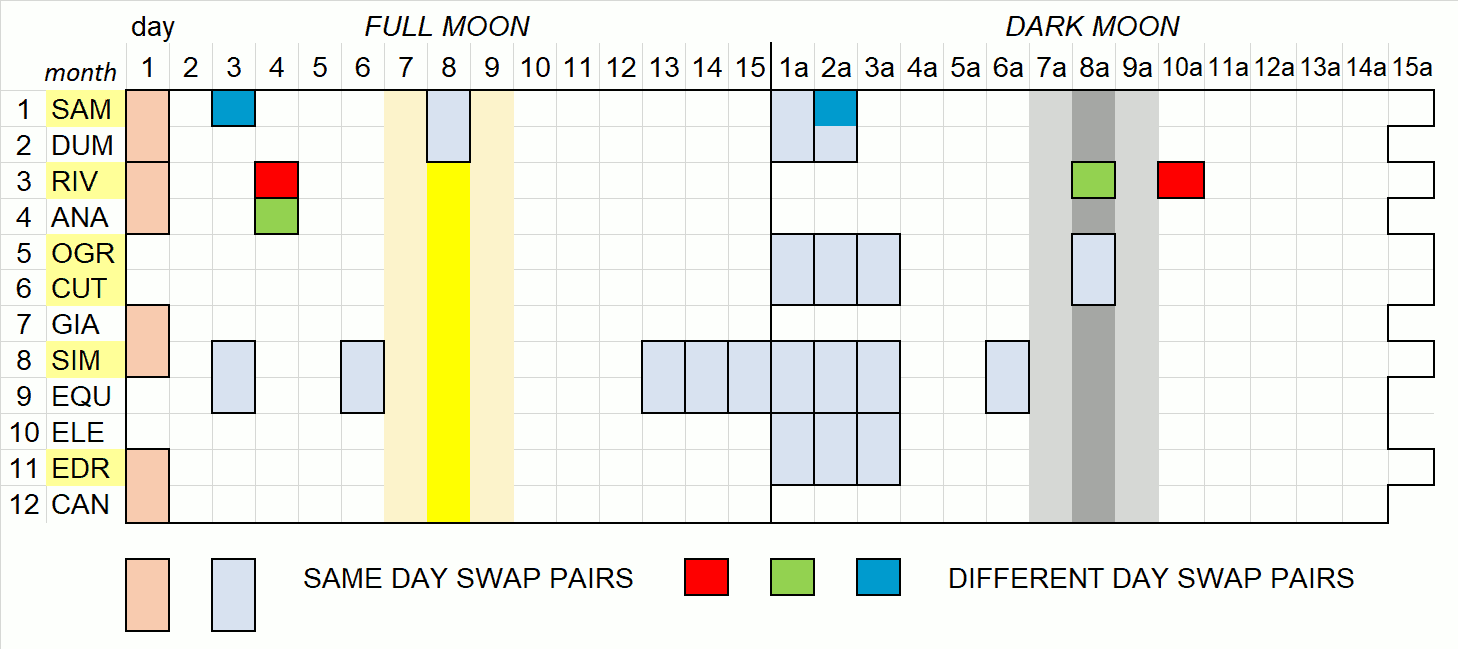
the pairs of swapped days

There are several patterns in which two days swap their notations. (Note: Exchanged days always occur between neighbouring months, but are not always between MAT and ANM months)

- The first pattern only involves Day 1 in four pairs of months.
- The second pattern involves days other than Day 1, and uses a different set of four pairs of months to swap between. Days are swapped with the same day of a neighbouring month.
- A third pattern is called the anomalous swaps, where days are swapped between a different day of a month. This occurs just three times per year: between SAM 3 and SAM 2a, between RIV 4 and RIV 10a, and between RIV 8a and ANA 4. (Note: The anomalous swaps were partially identified by MacNeill in 1928, later by Duval & Pinault in 1986, Olmsted in 1988, and McKay in 2018.)

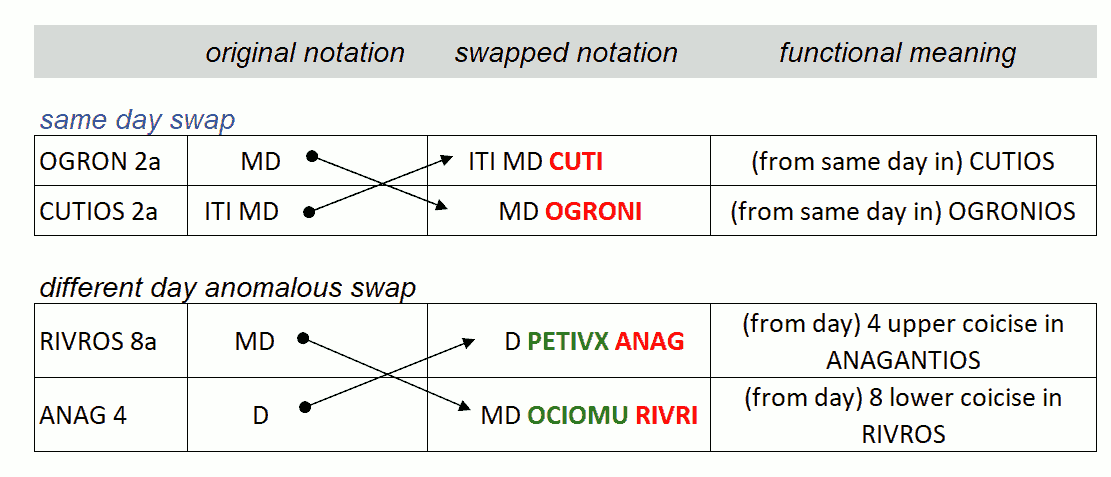
examples of the same and different day swaps

As the notations of one day are moved to another, they take the information with them about their original position (presumably so that one day can be used to prognosticate for its swapped partner). As most movements are to the same day of the month, the day information is redundant, so only the month name (in the genitive) is added. But anomalous swaps between different days require both their original day name and the month to be added. (Note: The notation TRINVX SAMONI, found at SAM 2a, means that its notations were originally at SAMONIOS day 3 in the upper coicise. SAM 3 is the last day of the IVOS festival at the beginning of SAMONIOS, presumably the equivalent of the Beltaine festival. It is not associated with Samhain, being in the summer month of SAMONIOS. It is not a three-night festival, being explicitly marked as a daytime D 'day' and SINDIV IVOS 'festival this (one) day'.)

==== EXCHANGES: Dragging notations between months ====
Examples in YEAR 1
| Dates | Pre-drag | Post-drag |
|---|---|---|
| 7 GIA | PRINI LAG | MD SIMIVIS TIOCOBREXTIO |
| 8 GIA | D | MD SIMIVIS |
| 9 GIA | N INIS R | MD SIMIVIS SINDIV IVOS |
| 7 SIM | MD TIOCOBREXTIO | D EQVI |
| 8 SIM | MD | PRINI LAG EQVI |
| 9 SIM | MD SINDIV IVOS | D EQVI |
| 7 EQV | D | D ELEMB |
| 8 EQV | PRINI LAG | D ELEMB |
| 9 EQV | D EQVI | D ELEMB |

For the 12 lunar months after an intercalary month, the notations of the triplet of days 7-8-9 (the full moon) and 7a-8a-9a (the dark moon) in each month are dragged sequentially upwards to the previous month, like beads on a string. Their original month name is then added to the notations.

Dragging IVOS in Year 1
| Dates | 28 OGR | 29 OGR | 30 OGR | 01 CVT | 02 CVT | 03 CVT | 28 CVT | 29 CVT | 30 CVT | 01 GIA | 02 GIA | 03 GIA |
|---|---|---|---|---|---|---|---|---|---|---|---|---|
| Pre- Drag | D AMB | MD | D AMB | MD | MD | MD | D AMB; IVOS | MD; IVOS | D AMB; IVOS | MD; SIMI; IVOS | MD; IVOS | MD; IVOS |
| Post- drag | D AMB; IVOS | MD; IVOS | D AMB; IVOS | MD; IVOS | MD; IVOS | MD; IVOS | D AMB ← | MD ← | D AMB ← | MD; SIMI ← | D ← | D ← |

The notation IVOS is also sequentially dragged upwards a month in the post-intercalary year. However, it does not take all the other notations with it. This keeps the festival runs marked with IVOS intact. The same also applies to SINDIV IVOS.

=== The notations of the intercalary months ===
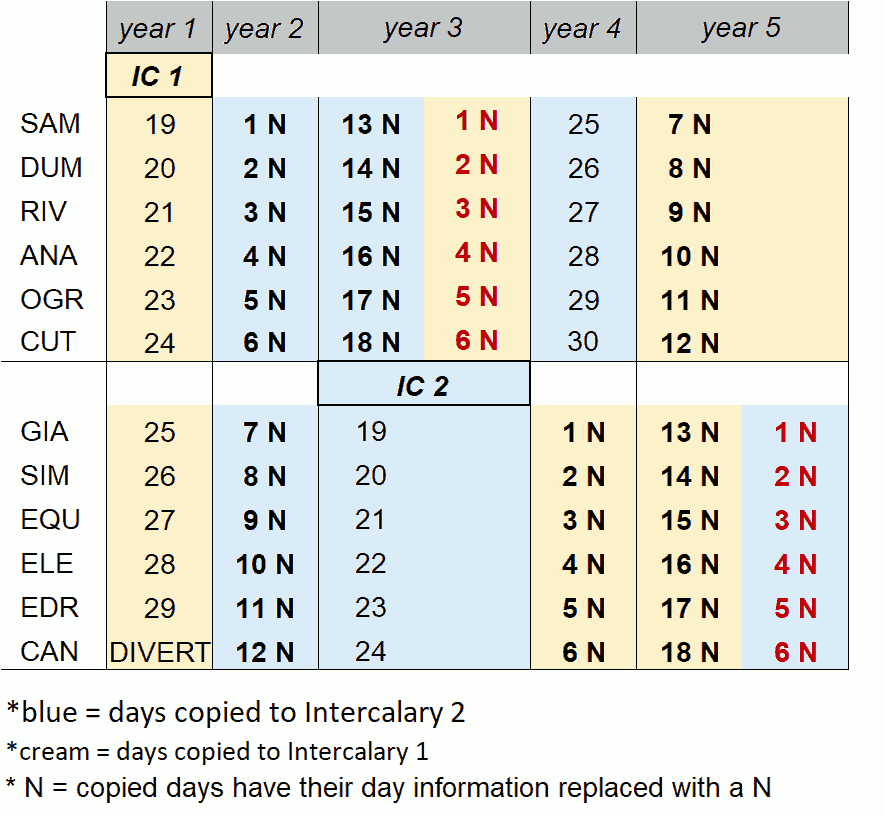
days copied to the intercalary months

The notations on the days of the intercalary months are created by a complex series of copies and merges of notations from certain days in the normal lunar months. Each day of an intercalary month sequentially copies a lunar month and the same day number, with its source month name added. At first 30 days are copied, and for days 1 to 18, their day number is replaced with a single N at the copied site. Secondly, a sequence of days 1 to 6 is again copied from a different year, and these are merged with the first. Thirdly, the days 7-8-9 and 7a-8a-9a which have been dragged from the following month are again merged with the copied notations. At which point, the calendar's notations are complete.

== Bibliography ==
- Delamarre, Xavier (2003). Dictionnaire de la langue gauloise: une approche linguistique du vieux-celtique continental. 2nd edition, Paris, Editions Errance. ISBN 2-87772-237-6.
- Dottin, Georges, La langue gauloise : grammaire, textes et glossaire (1920) no. 53, pp. 172–207.
- Duval, Paul-Marie and Pinault, Georges (eds) (1986). Recueil des inscriptions gauloises (R.I.G.), Vol. 3: Les calendriers de Coligny (73 fragments) et Villards d'Heria (8 fragments). Paris, Editions du CNRS.
- Hitz, Hans-Rudolf (1991). Der gallo-lateinische Mond- und Sonnen-Kalender von Coligny.
- Joyce, P.W. (2000). "Old Celtic Romances". The pursuit of the Giolla Dacker and his horse. Wordsworth Editions Limited, London.
- Laine-Kerjean, C. (1943). "Le calendrier celtique". Zeitschrift für celtische Philologie, 23, pp. 249–84.
- Delamarre, Xavier (2003). La langue gauloise. Paris, Editions Errance. 2nd edition. ISBN 2-87772-224-4. Chapter 9 is titled "Un calendrier gaulois".
- Le Contel, Jean-Michel and Verdier, Paul (1997). Un calendrier celtique: le calendrier gaulois de Coligny. Paris, Editions Errance. ISBN 2-87772-136-1
- Mc Cluskey, Stephen C. (1990). "The Solar Year in the Calendar of Coligny". Études Celtiques, 27, pp. 163–74.
- McKay, Helen (2016). "The Coligny calendar as a Metonic lunar calendar". Études Celtiques, XLII, pp. 95–122.
- McKay, Helen (2018). "Defining the systematic patterns for the triple marks of the Coligny calendar". Études Celtiques, XLIV, pp. 91–118.
- McKay, Helen (2022). "Building the Intercalary Months of the Coligny calendar". Études Celtiques, XLVIII, pp. 55–78.
- Mac Neill, Eóin (1928). "On the notation and chronology of the Calendar of Coligny". Ériu, X, pp. 1–67.
- Monard, Joseph (1996). About the Coligny Calendar. privately published monograph.
- Monard, Joseph (1996). Découpage saisonnier de l'année celtique. privately published monograph.
- Monard, Joseph (1999). Histoire du calendrier gaulois : le calendrier de Coligny. Paris, Burillier. ISBN 2-912616-01-8
- Olmsted, Garrett (1992). The Gaulish calendar: a reconstruction from the bronze fragments from Coligny, with an analysis of its function as a highly accurate lunar-solar predictor, as well as an explanation of its terminology and development. Bonn: R. Habelt. ISBN 3-7749-2530-5
- Parisot, Jean-Paul (1985). "Les phases de la Lune et les saisons dans le calendrier de Coligny". Études indo-européennes, 13, pp. 1–18.
- Pinault, J. (1951). "Notes sur le vocabulaire gaulois, I. Les noms des mois du calendrier de Coligny". Ogam, XIII, pp. 143–154
- Rhys, John (1910). "The Coligny Calendar". Proceedings of the British Academy, 4, pp. 207–318.
- Thurneysen, Rudolf (1899). "Der Kalender von Coligny". Zeitschrift für celtische Philologie, 2, pp. 523–544
- Zavaroni, Adolfo (2007). On the structure and terminology of the Gaulish calendar, British Archaeological Reports British Series.
