= Wetland deposits in Scandinavia =

Archaeological sites in Scandinavia

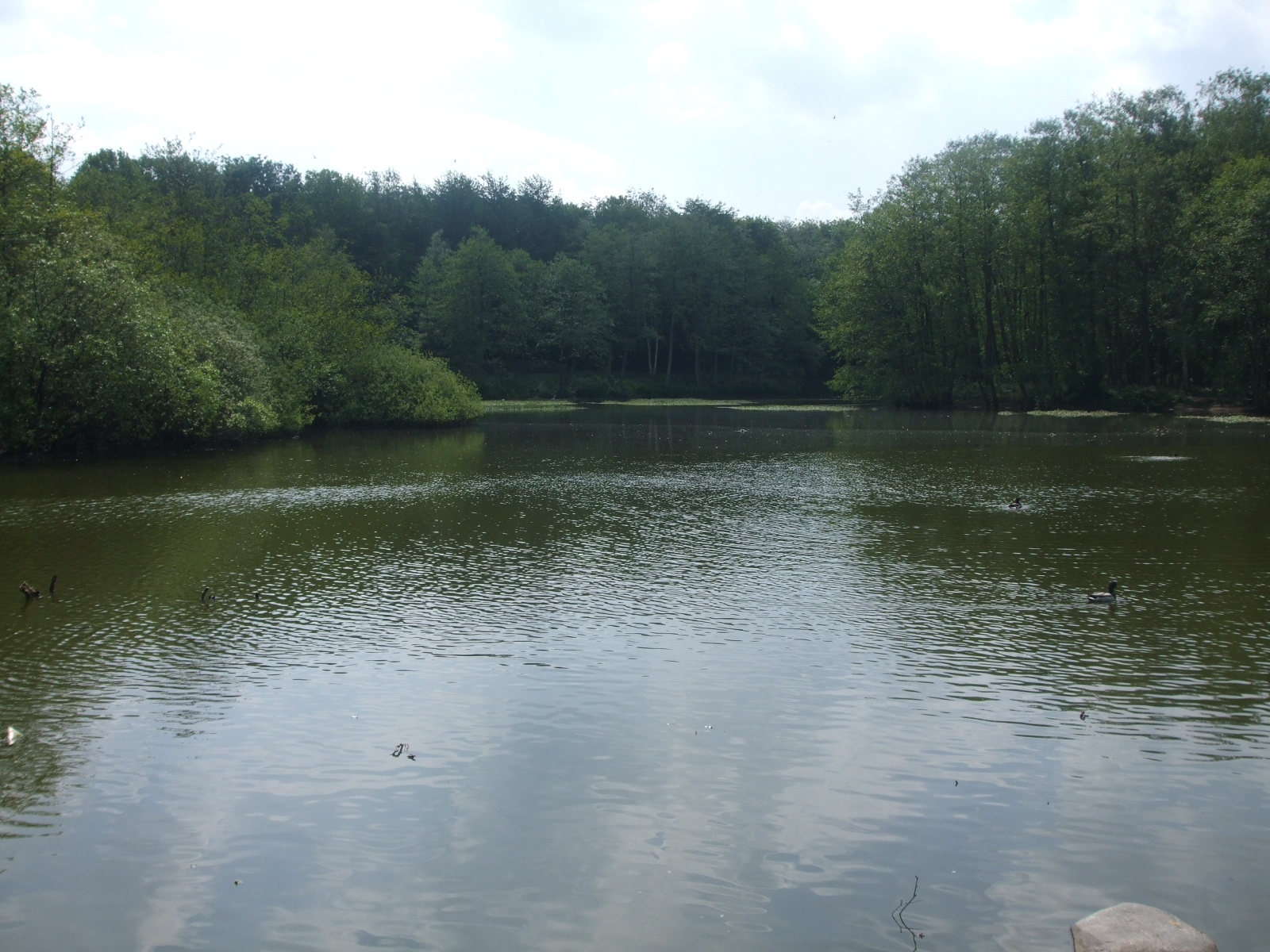
Thorsberg moor in Anglia, Schleswig-Holstein, modern Germany, was the site of depositions for four centuries

In many areas of Scandinavia, a wide variety of items were deposited in lakes and bogs from the Mesolithic period through to the Middle Ages. Such items include earthenware, decorative metalwork, weapons, and human corpses, known as bog bodies. As Kaul noted, "we cannot get away from the fact that the depositions in the bogs were connected with the ritual/religious sphere."

The earliest examples of wetland deposits from Scandinavia come from the Mesolithic, including elk bones and earthenware vessels. In the Neolithic, earthenware vessels and flint axes were deposited in the wetlands, with a number of wooden platforms being constructed to allow greater access to the wetlands themselves. In the Bronze Age, a wide variety of different items were placed into bogs, although the levels of deposition fluctuated throughout the period. It also witnessed the deposition of several high-value metal items, including the Trundholm sun chariot and a number of lurs and shields. The Pre-Roman Iron Age witnessed the continued deposition of these high-status item, including decorated metal cauldrons, most notably the Gundestrup cauldron. It also saw the deposition of increasingly complex assemblages, which often brought together animal and human bones with stones, sticks, and wooden equipment.

Many of the items deposited in bogs were highly valuable. It is possible that some artefacts also ended up in bogs and lakes without deliberate human intent, for instance if they were lost by accident or produced in settlements that existed adjacent to such wetland areas.

== Terminology ==
Given that these items are typically interpreted as having a religious or cultic purpose, terms such as "offerings", "sacrifices" and "votive deposits" have been used to refer to them, however "depositions" is sometimes favoured as being more neutral. Kaul noted that "in many cases it can be difficult to tell whether the deposition had a practical function or was related to religion and ritual."

Bogs and wetland areas were widespread in much of southern Scandinavia in the past, although many have been destroyed since the Middle Ages due to drainage and agricultural use. Archaeological evidence makes it clear that they were not always remote or inaccessible places in prehistoric contexts, and in various cases were located close to human settlements. Kaul suggested that "the bogs can be regarded as uncultivated areas that were closer to the forces of nature, where people felt closer to divine beings." In some cases, it appears that items were not actually deposited into the water or bog itself, but were placed on dry-land adjacent to the water.

The majority of artefacts from bogs and other wetland contexts in Scandinavia were not discovered through archaeological investigation, but have been discovered by accident, particularly by individuals engaged in peat cutting.

== Mesolithic ==
A number of items have been discovered in wetland places that were deposited during the Mesolithic, or "Middle Stone Age" period of Scandinavian prehistory. A number of deposits of elk bones dating to c.9500 BCE have been found in Lundby Bog in South Sealand, while several others dated to c.8500 BCE and associated with the Maglemosian culture have been found at Skottemarke on Lolland and at Favrbo in West Sealand. Parallels have been drawn with some of the hunting rituals which have been ethnographically recorded among the Sami people in northern Scandinavia.

A number of artefacts associated with the Late Ertebølle culture have also been found in bogs, among them earthenware vessels, flint-core axes, and imported shoe-last celts. At Mosegaard Bog in Åmosen, Central Sealand, a collection of 21 pierced animal teeth were found together in a wetland context, with Kaul suggesting that these could probably be considered "a Mesolithic ritual deposition".

== Neolithic ==
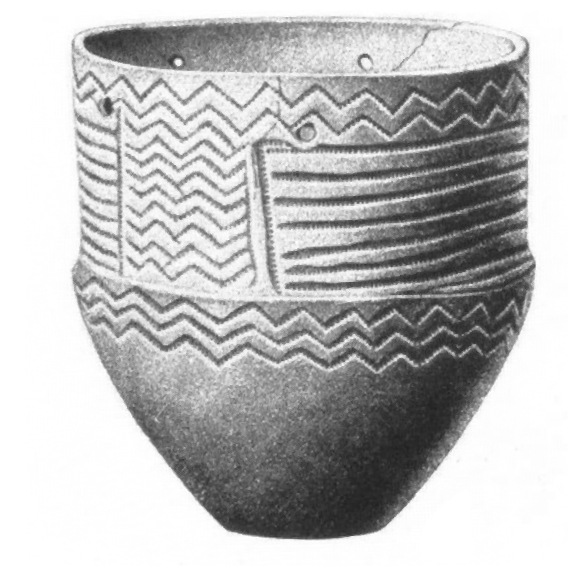
In the Early and Middle Neolithic, funnel beakers, such as that depicted here, were deposited in Scandinavian wetlands

In a number of cases, it has been shown that Neolithic settlements were located very close to the edge of a bog or lake, in some instances where items from the same period had been deposited. These settlements were likely inhabited on a seasonal basis, from where people hunted and fished but also brought domestic animals with them. For instance, at Storelyng IV, a site in the Central Sealand Åmose which is dated to c.3400 BCE, archaeological evidence indicates that a community arrived there in mid-May, where they hunted, fished, and gathered shellfish in the adjacent lake, before slaughtering a number of goats that they had brought with them and departing in mid-August.

A characteristic of Early Neolithic depositions is the placing of earthenware vessels near to the banks of a lake, something which may have parallels in the latter part of the preceding Mesolithic Ertebølle culture. This tradition was carried out for around a thousand years, from c.4000 BCE to shortly before 3000 BCE, when the practice largely died out. Archaeological analysis of burnt remains of food on the inside of some of the earthenware funnel beakers from this period reveals that they contained a fish soup, although traces of acorn have also been identified. It is unclear whether these earthenware items were actually deposited in the water with food in them, or whether this had been consumed or otherwise removed beforehand.

In many cases, animal bones have also been deposited alongside the earthenware. Zooarchaeological analysis of the bones have revealed that sheep or goats are well represented in the assemblages, with domestic ox also being common, although both pig and wild animals like red deer and roe deer have also been found. The bones have often been split, so as to allow bone marrow extraction, suggesting that the animals had been eaten prior to the deposition of the bones. These assemblages are often interpreted as the result of a ritual meals consumed communally, with sheep or goats being of particular symbolic importance at these events, given that their remains are far less common in debris from settlement sites.

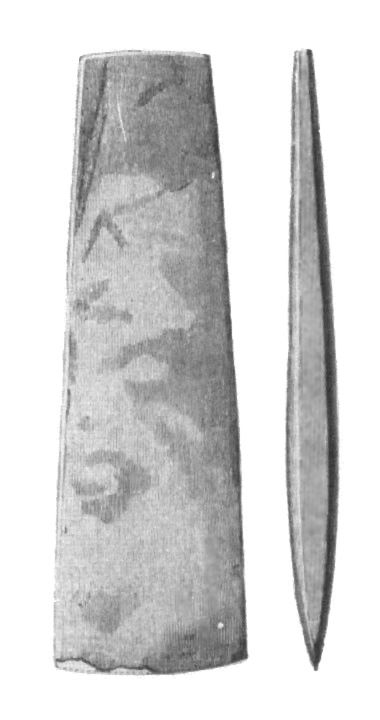
Flint axes were often deposited in wetlands in the Neolithic

Flint axes were also placed in bogs during the Neolithic, with examples having been identified as belonging to the Early, Middle, and Late periods of this era. In some instances they are associated with earthenware deposits, although in others they are found alone; this is particularly evident in the Scania area, where earthenware deposits are scarce. In various cases, multiple axes were deposited in the same place; one such example was found under controlled excavation conditions at Gamla Wärslätt in Billinge Parish, Scania. Here, four Early Neolithic flint axes were found close to each other, in what had evidently been peat at the time of deposition, for one was found standing vertically, and the other horizontally. It was believed that they had not been deposited together in one event, but independently. In a few instance, it is clear that simple copper axes, which had been imported into Scandinavia from southern Europe, were deposited in wetlands from the Early Neolithic onward.

In various instances, amber beads were deposited in wetlands; such deposits are particularly in North and North West Jutland. In one case, at Mollerup in Salling, 13,000 small amber beads were found in an Early Neolithic earthenware vessel.

During the Early Neolithic, many human remains associated with the Funnelbeaker culture were deposited in Scandinavian wetlands. Both entire skeletons and singular skulls have been found; it is unclear if these latter remains were originally deposited without the rest of the body, or whether the rest of the body was simply not discovered. One Neolithic skeleton from Sigersdal in Veksø Bog, west of Copenhagen, was found to have a thin plant fibre cord wound repeatedly around its neck, suggesting the possibility that the individual was strangled before deposition. Similar cords around the neck were found on two other Neolithic bog skeletons, one from Stenstrup Bog in North West Sealand and the other from Bolkilde Bog in Als, South Jutland. Human remains appear to have declined greatly in the Late Neolithic.

A number of wooden platforms have been identified from Neolithic Scandinavia, and attributed to the Funnelbeaker culture. These would have permitted access to a specific part of the lake or bog, where deposits could then be made. An example found to be 10 metres wide and 22 metres long and constructed from branches and twigs was discovered in Saltpetermosen in Hillerød, North Sealand. At this specific site, deposits had been made throughout the Early Neolithic and into the early part of the Middle Neolithic, and included two funnel beakers, ox and lamb bones, and both a greenstone axe and slate axe. Another example of a wooden platform, believed to be c.50m long and c.10m wide was found at Veggerslev Bog in Djursland, East Jutland, where it had also served as a platform for depositional practices and which again stretched from the Early Neolithic into the Middle Neolithic.

The depositional practices changed during the Neolithic. Around 3000 BCE, the tradition of placing earthenware vessels, Funnelbeaker Culture battle-axes and amber into waterplaces rapidly declined, at the same time as the deposition of these items in front of the facades of megalithic tombs also declined. Conversely, the deposition of flint-axes continued unaffected, both in water-places and in front of the tombs. The Late Neolithic saw the arrival of metal technologies in Scandinavia, with both the development of bronze technologies and the arrival of items imported from elsewhere. This Late Neolithic metalwork is extremely rare in graves of this period, although have been found buried as single finds or as hoards, both in wetland and dryland sites. One of the most prominent examples was from Gallemose near Randers in East Jutland; here, nine flanged axes (of disparate origins; one is from Central Europe, another from the British Isles, and another from Scandinavia) were deposited alongside three large hooks and nine large rings, all of which appear to have been made somewhere south of the Baltic. The Late Neolithic also witnessed the arrival of gold artefacts into Scandinavia, although few of these appear to have been deposited into waterplaces.

== Bronze Age ==
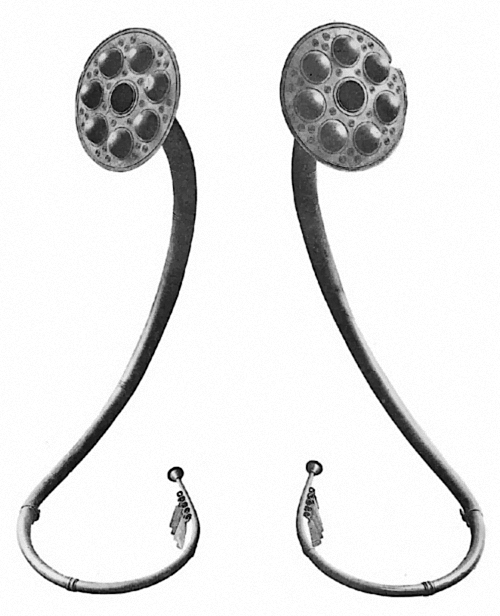
Brudevælte Lurs from Brudevælte, Denmark

In Scandinavia, the Bronze Age is viewed as starting around 1700 BCE. The period is named after the rapid rise in the number of bronze artifacts which have been discovered from this period, many of which had been deposited in wetlands. Other however were deposited on dry land sites, with it appearing that these items were often treated in the same manner regardless of the place of deposition. Depositions in the Bronze Age of this area are often characterized by the general absence of wooden platforms, earthenware vessels, bones, and wooden figurines, which are present in other periods. Only in a few examples are earthenware vessels, bones and figurines present from this period, in what are typically highly isolated depositions.

Many everyday objects were placed into the wetlands during this period, in some cases as single finds and in others of assemblages containing a variety of different form of artifact. Such items include working tools such as sickles and axes, weapons (namely swords and spearheads), and decorative items, such as Late Bronze Age celts, neck ring, and belt ornaments.

Other items deposited in the wetlands during the Bronze Age were far rarer and wealthier goods, and these have been more readily associated with religious practice among archaeologists; such items include the Trundholm sun chariot, the horned Veksø helmets, and the lur horns. At Mariesminde on Funen, 11 golden bowls with horse-head handles were found inside a bronze amphora that had been imported into Scandinavia from Central Europe. At Midskov in Funen seven gold bowls were found in a small waterhole under 20 metres in diameter. Many of these items would have been represented high material value and a high degree of craftsmanship. They would have been obtained from further south in Europe, and depositing them in the wetlands would have therefore taken them out of circulation. Kaul suggested that such luxury items may have been used for a certain number of years, for specific ceremonial occasions, before they were removed from circulation by being deposited in the wetlands. Various explanations have been put forward to explain this rise; perhaps it represents the increasing importance of a female deity in the religious beliefs of the area, or it could indicate a growth in women's societal status in this period. Conversely, these feminine items could have represented male status in Bronze Age Scandinavia.

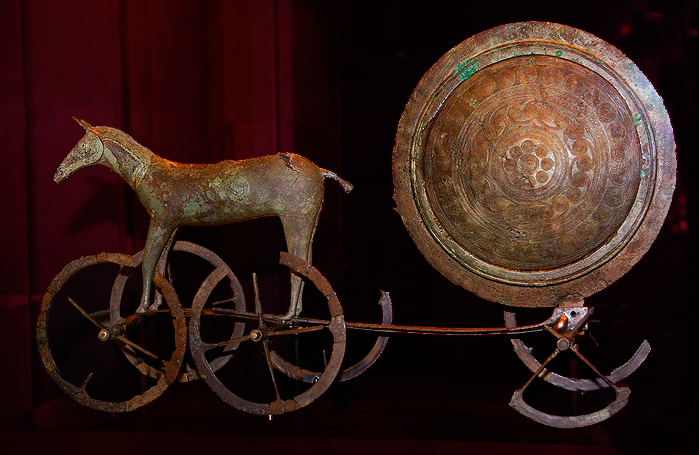
The Trundholm sun chariot was found deposited in wetland

A number of shields dating from the Late Bronze Age have also been found in Scandinavian wetlands. These items were likely imported and have been found at such sites as Falster, Himmerland in Jutland, and at Halland. It has been suggested that they served a cultic, as opposed to practical, military purpose. In some cases these were found as hoards; 16 shields were found close together in two heaps at the Fröslunda bog near to Lake Vänern in Västergötland in Sweden.

The deposition of human remains in wetland contexts appears absent from the Early Bronze Age, just after it had declined in the Late Neolithic. However, they begin to reappear in the Late Bronze Age, from which these depositions continue into the Early Iron Age.

There was clear chronological change throughout the Bronze Age. Throughout what archaeologists have termed Period I and Period II (c.1600–1300 BCE) the number of depositions rose rapidly while the content of the depositions also increased with the inclusion of a wide variety of items. The quantity of bronze items declined during Period III (1300–1100 BCE), before rising again in Period IV (1100–900 BCE) and reaching a peak in Period V (900–700 BCE) before a further decline in Period VI (700–500 BCE). Throughout this period there are also other differences that are apparent; bronze objects associated with women are not present in Period I, although have begun to appear by Period II and by Period VI they were the dominant form of artefact in the wetland deposits.

== Iron Age ==
=== Pre-Roman Iron Age ===
It is apparent that in the Iron Age, Scandinavian communities began to exploit the bogs in ways that they had not done before. Bog ore was obtained for use in iron production, while there is evidence that peat cutting for use as fuel began in the Pre-Roman Iron Age. This new usage of the resource may have led to "changes in the sacral use of bogs and wetlands too". In various cases it is apparent that individuals returned to the same site on repeated occasions to add more depositions; thus Kaul stated that while in Bronze Age Scandinavia, bogs were typically a place only for deposition, in the Iron Age "the bog became a place where rituals were clearly performed, a sacral place more closely linked with the human world."

The wetland deposits of the Pre-Roman Iron Age shared many traits with those of the preceding Period VI of the Bronze Age. Deposits of bronze neck rings continued, however the deposition of the twisted Wendel ring ceased at an early stage in the Pre-Roman Iron Age. At the same time, a number of new forms of neck rings that had developed in the Pre-Roman Iron Age were deposited, both the crown neck-rings and the ball torques. The Pre-Roman Iron Age also saw the revival of deposits of earthenware vessels, perhaps containing food, into the bogs; a tradition that had been present in the Early Neolithic but which was largely absent from the Bronze Age. In almost all cases, these are isolated instances, and are not clustered with other earthenware pots.

From the Early Iron Age, there was also an appearance of complex depositions, some of which were accompanied by earthenware and others that were not. These included depositions of animal bones and in some cases human bones, heaps of stones, and wooden items such as wheels and other wagon parts or wooden poles, some of which had anthropomorphic or phallic shapes. A notable site from this period was discovered at Forlev Nymølle, near Skanderborg, East Jutland. Here, there was evidence of a continuing tradition of deposition that lasted between c.200 and 50 BCE, resulting in the creation of several separate heaps of items. Some of these consisted of a variety of different items, such as wooden objects, earthenware vessels, animal bones, small stones, and tree branches. In one of the mounds was an anthropomorphic figure that is 2.74 m long, created from a forked piece of oak. It was found alongside a truss of flax, a heap of hand-sized stones, some worked pieces of wood, sherds of an earthenware vessels, and a few goat bones; these items were probably deposited in the wetland along with the statue.

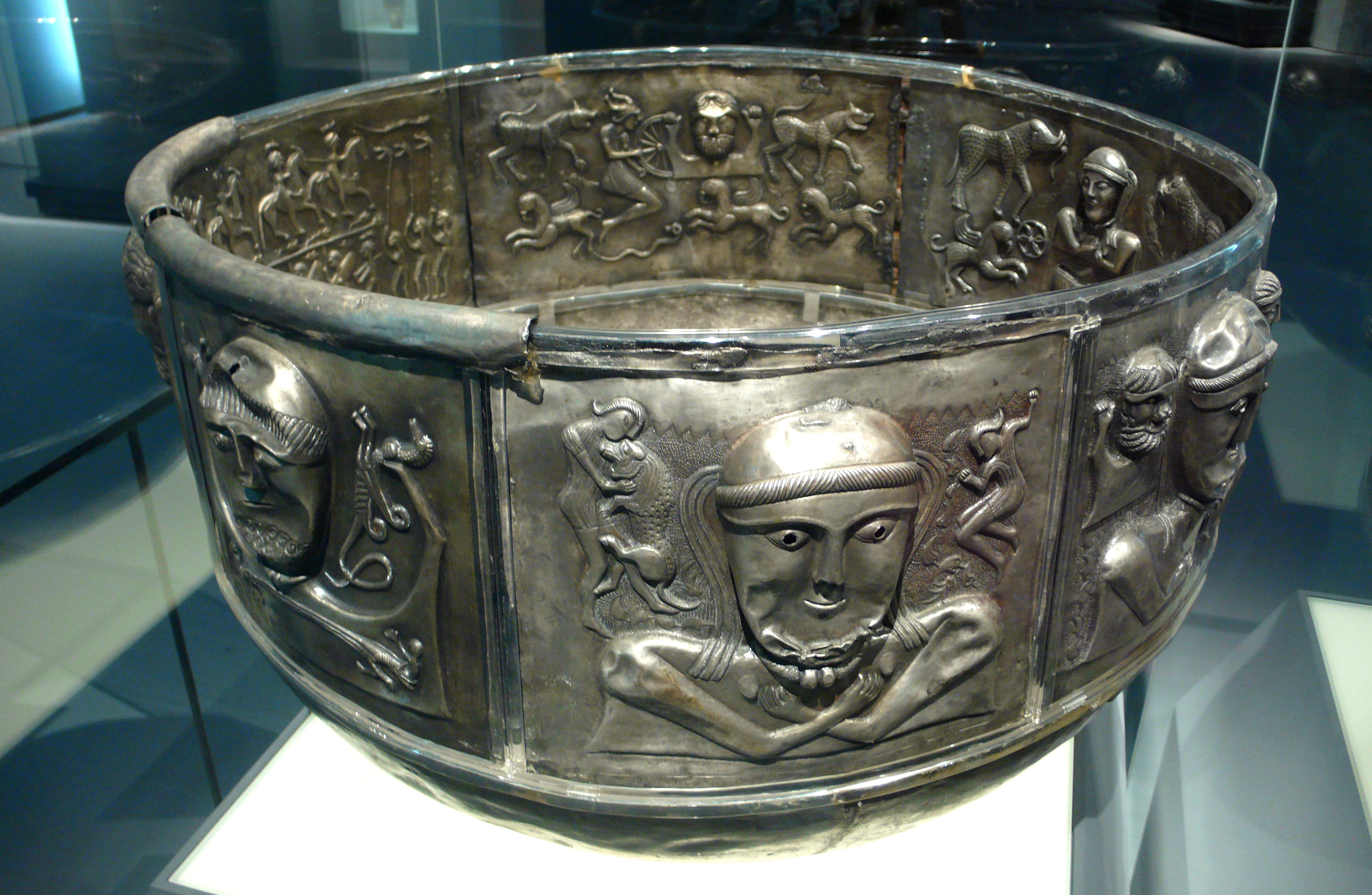
The Gundestrup Cauldron is a prominent example of a deposit from the Pre-Roman Iron Age

Another noted site was discovered from the bog at Hedeliskær at Skødstrup in the north of Århus, East Jutland. Here, a wooden figure was surrounded with earthenware vessels, animal and human bones, and a number of shattered pots and two iron knives placed above it. Around this layer were the complete skeletons of thirteen dogs, tied to two large stones, and nearby was a small collection of human skull and arm bones and a wooden phallic figurine. The inclusion of dogs as deposits was found at a wide variety of sites during this period. In various instances, they were deposited alongside earthenware vessels; at Tibirke Bog in North Sealand, a Pre-Roman Iron Age deposit contained the remains of three dogs interspersed with earthenware potsherds in a heap, close to some complete earthenware vessels, wooden sticks, and stones.

As with the preceding Bronze Age, the Pre-Roman Iron Age also witnessed the deposition of rare valuable items into wetlands. Indeed, the latter part of the Pre-Roman Iron Age witnessed the largest number of such high prestige items deposited in these contexts at any point in Scandinavian prehistory. The most prominent examples of these are the Gundestrup Cauldron and Mosbæk Cauldron, both of which were found in Himmerland, Jutland, as well as the bronze cauldrons from Rynkeby on Funen and Sophienborg in North Sealand. These valuable items, all of which were imported goods created elsewhere in Europe, are rarely found in conjunction with other items, such as earthenware, bones, or stone heaps, which has led to the suggestion that they were not placed into the water with elaborate ritual or ceremony. While many of these valuable items were clearly of foreign manufacture, a small number of others appear to have been created within Scandinavia itself, such as a gold torc from Lavindsgård bog on Funen and a neck ring from Løgtved Bog in West Sealand. It is also evident that the Pre-Roman Iron Age witnessed the earliest weapon burials into Scandinavian wetland contexts; these have been found in Hjortspring, although the weapons from Krogsbølle may also be from this date. None show evidence of burning prior to deposition. Such weapon burials become far more common in the ensuing Roman Iron Age and Migration Period.

The Pre-Roman Iron Age contained the highest quantity of human remains deposited in wetlands of any period in prehistoric Scandinavia. A variety of bog bodies from this period have been found to have been killed either through strangulation or having their throat slits. Interpretations have typically argued that these individuals were the victims of human sacrifice, capital punishment, or a rite combining both.

=== Roman Iron Age ===
The deposition of dogs in wetland sites also continued into the early Roman Iron Age, where again they were often associated with earthenware vessels. One Late Roman Iron Age deposit found in the Hundstrup Bog in South Sealand contained five high-quality worked earthenware vessels; the four smaller cups were found beside one another, with the larger upside-down bowl covering them.

During the second and third centuries CE, there is evidence for a range of stable contacts between Northern Europe and the Roman Empire. The social elite in many Northern regions adopted the symbols and in some instances behaviour of the Romans.

Lars Jørgensen commented that the archaeological material from the bogs that dates from the Roman Iron Age was "so extensive that one can write a fully adequate, exciting narrative about the period." The peak in the number of weapon deposits is in the third century CE, with Jørgensen suggesting that this represented a peak in conflict in the region. Such weapon finds are not found in conjunction with human remains.

Although it has faced criticism, the dominant scholarly interpretation of these deposits is that they represent war booty captured from enemy soldiers. In this, the weapon deposits have been termed "the spoils of victory." One suggestion is that the deposits represent the fulfillment of a contract with supernatural entities; in such a scenario, the victorious side had entered into a contractual obligation rooted in gift-exchange whereby they agreed to offer up their war booty in payment for victory. Accounts of artifacts being sacrificed to the gods appear on various textual sources authored by Roman writers from this period; one of these appears in the Annals of Tacitus, which claims that after a battle in which the Hermunduri tribe defeated the Chatti in a battle of 58 CE, the victors devoted "the enemy's army to Mars and Mercury, a vow which consigns horses, men, everything indeed on the vanquished side to destruction." An earlier source, the Historiae Adversum Paganos of Orosius, states that following the Battle of Arausio in 105 BCE, the victorious Cimbri tribe "destroyed all that had fallen into their hands in an unheard-of and hitherto unknown maledictory ritual; clothing was torn apart and thrown away, gold and silver were thrown in the river, the men's armour was cut to pieces, the breastplates of the horses were sunk in the waters, the people were hanged from trees with a rope around their necks".

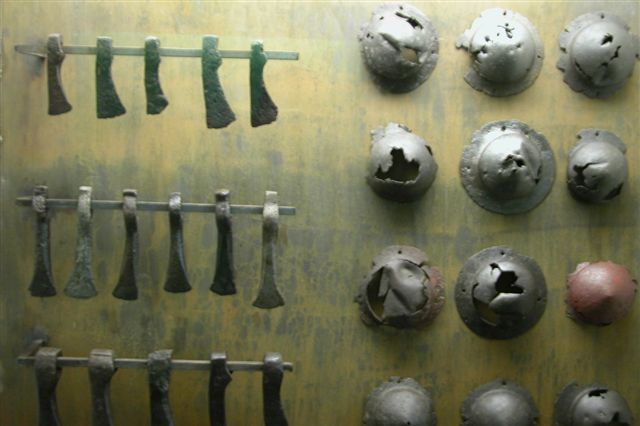
Objects discovered in Nydam Bog on display at Gottorp Castle

While this scenario provides the possibility for understanding more about conflict in Iron Age Scandinavia, it also leaves open the question of whether the deposits were made by troops engaged in defensive or offensive warfare. Jørgensen argues that the deposits may have been sacrifices made after a successful offensive, with a conquering army taking it from a foreign region and bringing it back to their own for deposition. Ilkjær believed that this model was "improbable for purely psychological reasons. Why risk life and limb for a conquest that was anyway to be sacrificed afterwards?" For this reason they deemed a defensive armed force to be a more likely candidate for being the victorious depositors. A third suggestion was provided by Hansen, when he argued that they may have been deposited by Scandinavian warriors who had been fighting either for or against the Roman Armies on the limes, and that upon their return they were attempting to seize land; they suggested that this was potentially evidenced by the large number of Roman artefacts in the depositions and the chronological correlation between the two events.

It has been suggested that the weapon depositions of this period represented an imitation of Roman sacrifices to the gods, which could have been brought to Scandinavia through the many Northern Europeans who served as mercenaries in the Roman army. However, in Scandinavia the places of deposition were in bogs and lakes, in keeping with ancient tradition, rather than in the temples favoured by Roman society.

Other suggestions have however been made regarding the nature of these weapon depositions. In 1857, the Danish archaeologist Jens Jacob Asmussen Worsaae suggested that they represented the detritus of nearby battles which had simply fallen into the wetlands. This was contested by fellow archaeologist Conrad Engelhardt, who demonstrated that the weapons had been deliberately sorted and organised into categories before being deposited.

=== Migration Period ===
Scandinavia's Migration Period lasted for approximately two centuries, from the latter fourth to the latter sixth century CE. There is great diversity in the deposits from the fifth to the sixth centuries, with a rapid decline in the number of deposits then occurring in the sixth.

Many dress accessories have been found in wetland contexts from the Migration Period. The Migration Period witnessed a large rise in the deposition of fibulae, with many cruciform fibulae being found as single finds in Scandinavian bogs. Gold bracteates from this period, most of which were created in Scandinavia, were also deposited in both wetlands and dryland sites; Kaul noted that with these items, "for the first time since the Bronze Age, objects with true, complex Scandinavian iconography were laid in bogs." In Gummersmark near Bjæverskov in South Sealand, eight bracteates were deposited alongside an amber bead, several glass beads, and a decorated silver-gilt fibulae.

During the Migration Age, there were a few examples of earthenware pots being placed in wetlands, although nowhere near the numbers that were seen in the Pre-Roman and early Roman Iron Age. It appears that ultimately, these earthenware deposits ceased during the period. One example, from Fjaltring in West Jutland, contained several small earthenware vessels on a number of flat stones. Animal bones, particularly those of horses but also sheep and cattle, were also deposited into wetland contexts in this period. Further, examples of bridle gear worn by horses was also found in some depositional contexts. There are also apparently unique items that have been found from wetland deposits of this period, such as the two gold horns from Gallehus in Jutland.

There is a unique example of a well-sculpted wooden male figurine, dressed in Migration Period style costume, that has been found from Rude Eskildstrup in South Sealand. Circa 42 cm tall, there has been debates as to whether it was a representation of a god or a human being. A number of bronze figurines have also been found in the bogs; some of these are Roman imports although others are cruder Scandinavian creation.

Kaul suggested that the decline in complex deposits associated with sacrificial practices, which had been present earlier in the Iron Age, indicated that in Migration Period Scandinavia, the locations for sacrifice had moved from the wetlands to areas controlled by the magnate, possibly in a building.

== Viking Age ==
Scandinavia's wetlands saw the deposition of separated military fittings into the seventh century CE.

== Antiquarian and archaeological interest ==
Flemming Kaul noted that "Many of the finest, most important aspects from our ancient history" came from bogs, and that without these bog finds Scandinavian museums would "be stripped" of their "most magnificent pieces".

== See also ==
- Wetlands and islands in Germanic paganism
