= Gundestrup cauldron =

Silver cauldron from Denmark dating to 200 BC to 300 AD

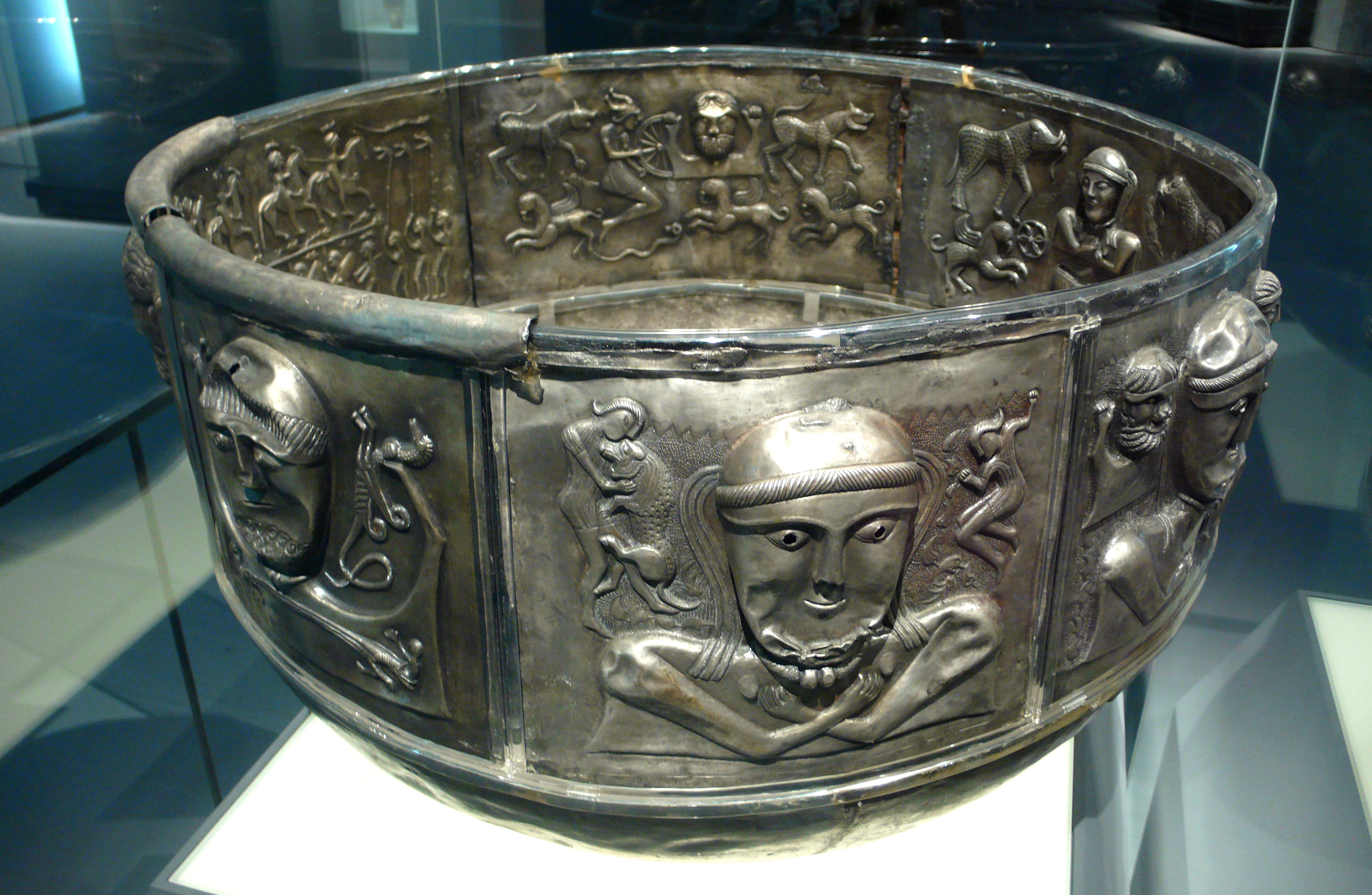
The Gundestrup Cauldron; exterior plates b, g, e

Discovery site in Denmark

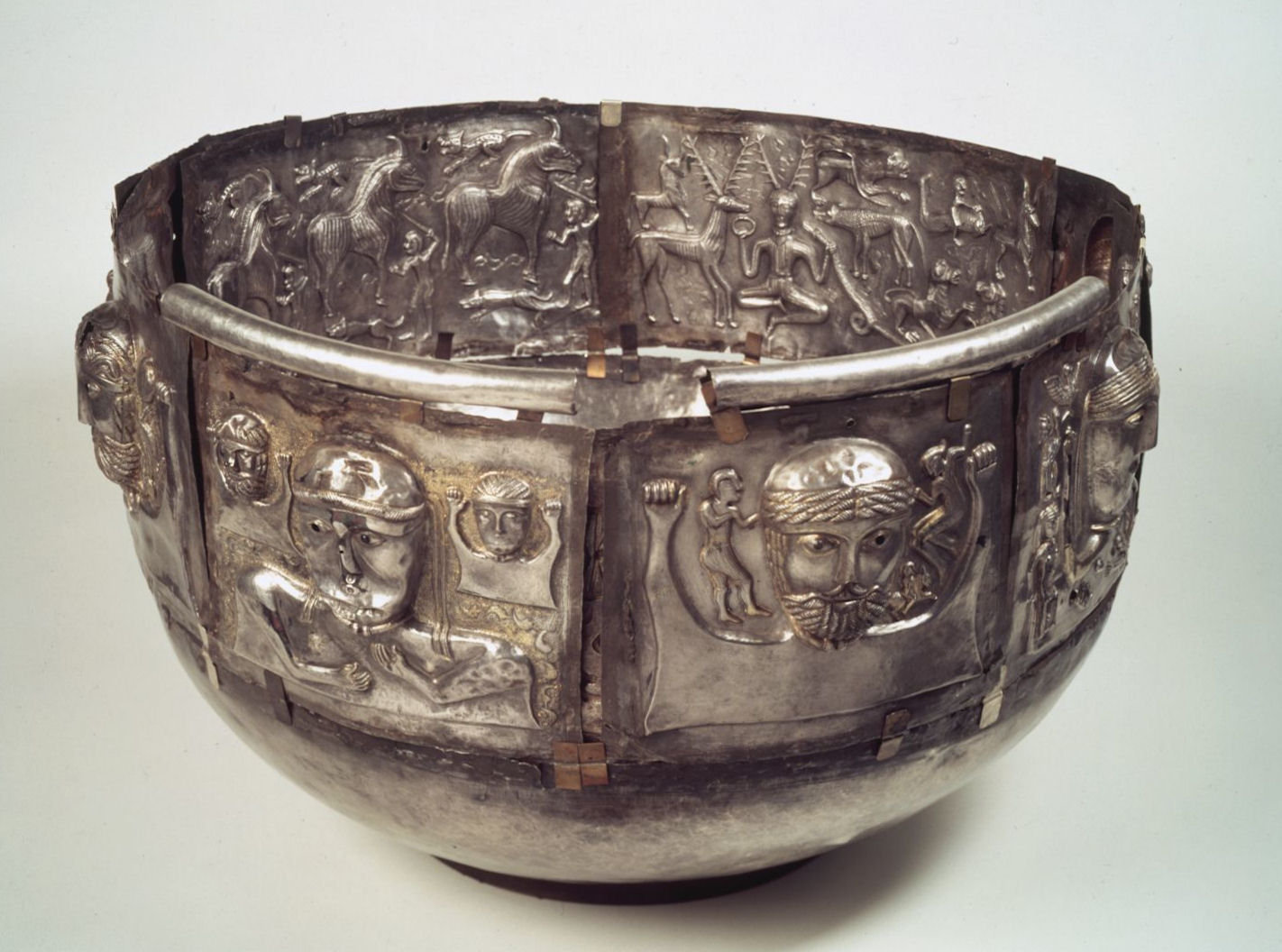
Another view; exterior plates d, e, c, f

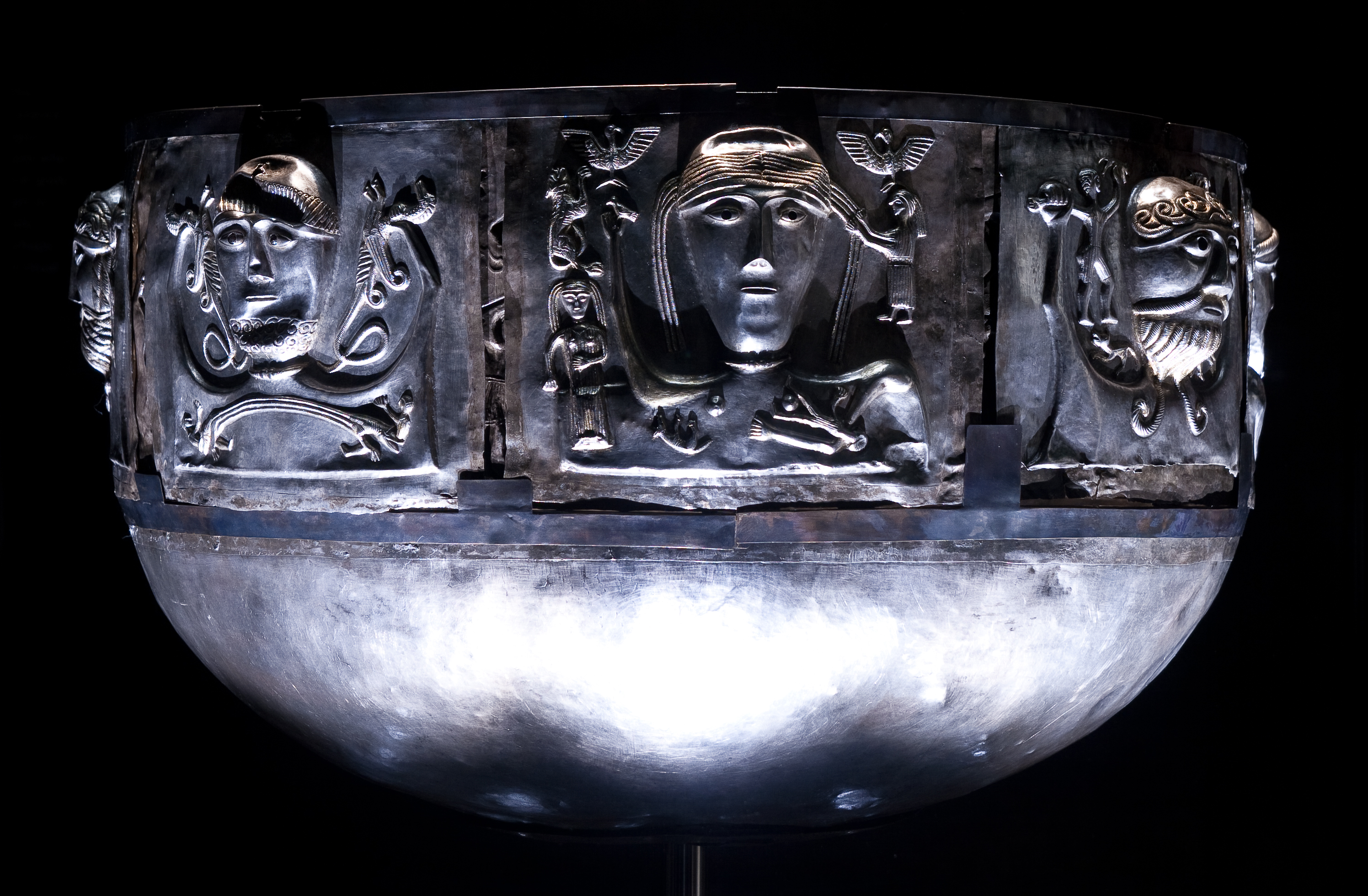
Further view; from left, exterior plates b, f, a

The Gundestrup cauldron is a richly decorated silver vessel, thought to date from between 200 BC and 300 AD, or more narrowly between 150 BC and 1 BC. (Note: NMD: "The dating and origin of the silver cauldron") This places it within the late La Tène period or early Roman Iron Age. The cauldron is the largest known example of European Iron Age silver work (diameter: 69 cm (27 in); height: 42 cm (17 in)). It was found dismantled, with the other pieces stacked inside the base, in 1891, in a peat bog near the hamlet of Gundestrup in the Aars parish of Himmerland, Denmark. It is now usually on display in the National Museum of Denmark in Copenhagen, with replicas at other museums; it was in the UK on a travelling exhibition called The Celts during 2015–2016.

The cauldron is not complete, and now consists of a rounded cup-shaped bottom making up the lower part of the cauldron, usually called the base plate, above which are five interior plates and seven exterior ones; a missing eighth exterior plate would be needed to encircle the cauldron, and only two sections of a rounded rim at the top of the cauldron survive. The base plate is mostly smooth and undecorated inside and out, apart from a decorated round medallion in the centre of the interior. All the other plates are heavily decorated with repoussé work, hammered from beneath to push out the silver. Other techniques were used to add detail, and there is extensive gilding and some use of inlaid pieces of glass for the eyes of figures. Other pieces of fittings were found. Altogether it weighs just under 9 kilograms (20 lb).

While the vessel was found in Denmark, it was probably not made there or nearby; it includes elements of Gaulish and Thracian origin in the workmanship, metallurgy, and imagery. The techniques and elements of the style of the panels relate closely to other Thracian silver, while much of the depiction, in particular of the human figures, relates to the Celts, though attempts to relate the scenes closely to Celtic mythology remain controversial. Other aspects of the iconography derive from the Near East.

Hospitality on a large scale was an obligation for Celtic elites, and although cauldrons were therefore an important item of prestige metalwork, they are usually much plainer and smaller than this. This is an exceptionally large and elaborate object with no similar discovered cauldron found, except a large fragment from a bronze cauldron also found in Denmark, at Rynkeby; however the exceptional wetland deposits in Scandinavia have produced a number of objects of types that were probably once common but where other examples have not survived. It has been much discussed by scholars, and represents a complex demonstration of the many cross-currents in European art, as well as an unusual degree of narrative for Celtic art, though we are unlikely to fully understand its original meanings.

== Discovery ==
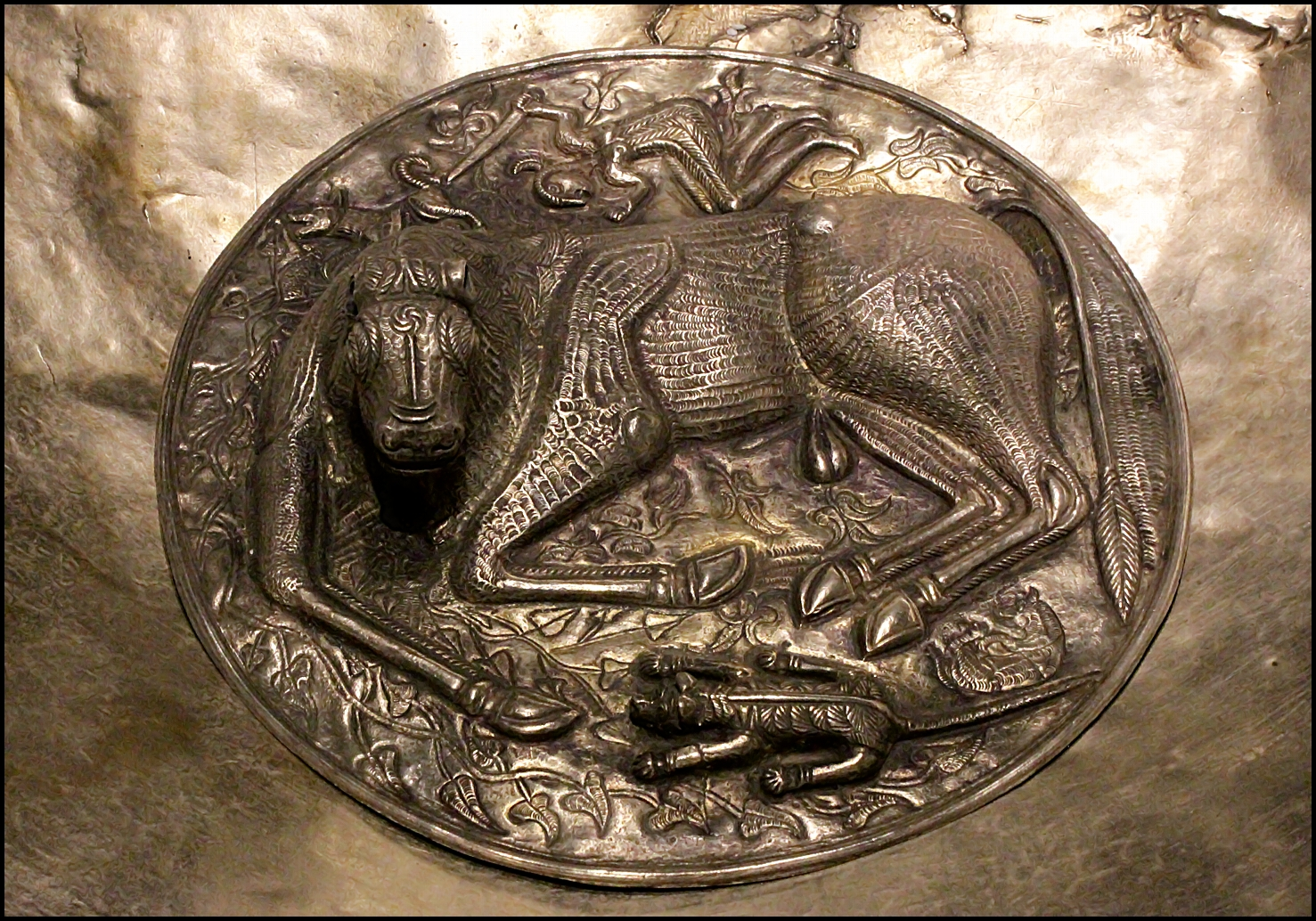
The central medallion of the base plate, from a replica

The Gundestrup cauldron was discovered by peat cutters in a small peat bog called "Rævemose" (near the larger "Borremose" bog) on 28 May 1891. The Danish government paid a large reward to the finders, who subsequently quarreled bitterly amongst themselves over its division. Palaeobotanical investigations of the peat bog at the time of the discovery showed that the land had been dry when the cauldron was deposited, and the peat gradually grew over it. The manner of stacking suggested an attempt to make the cauldron inconspicuous and well-hidden. Another investigation of Rævemose was undertaken in 2002, concluding that the peat bog may have existed when the cauldron was buried.

The cauldron was found in a dismantled state with five long rectangular plates, seven short plates, one round plate (normally called the "base plate"), and two fragments of tubing stacked inside the curved base. In addition, there is a piece of iron from a ring originally placed inside the silver tubes along the rim of the cauldron. It is assumed that an eighth short plate is missing because the circumference of the seven outer plates is smaller than the circumference of the five inner plates.

A set of careful full-size replicas have been made. One is in the National Museum of Ireland, and several are in France, including the Musée gallo-romain de Fourvière at Lyon and the Musée d'archéologie nationale at Saint-Germain-en-Laye.

== Reconstruction ==
Since the cauldron was found in pieces, it had to be reconstructed. The traditional order of the plates was determined by Sophus Müller, the first of many to analyze the cauldron. His logic uses the positions of the trace solder located at the rim of the bowl. In two cases, a puncture mark penetrating the inner and outer plates also helps to establish the order. In its final form, the plates are arranged in an alternation of female-male depictions, assuming the missing eighth plate is of a female.

Not all analysts agree with Müller's ordering, however. Timothy Taylor has pointed out that aside from the two cases of puncturing, the order cannot be determined from the solder alignments. His argument is that the plates are not directly adjacent to each other, but are separated by a 2 cm gap; thus, the plates in this order cannot be read with certainty as the true narrative, supposing one exists. However, Larsen indicates, not only did his study vindicate the order for the inner plates established, by Muller, Klindt-Jensen, and Olmsted, but the order of the outer plates is also established by the rivet holes, the solder alignments, and the scrape marks.

== Metallurgy ==
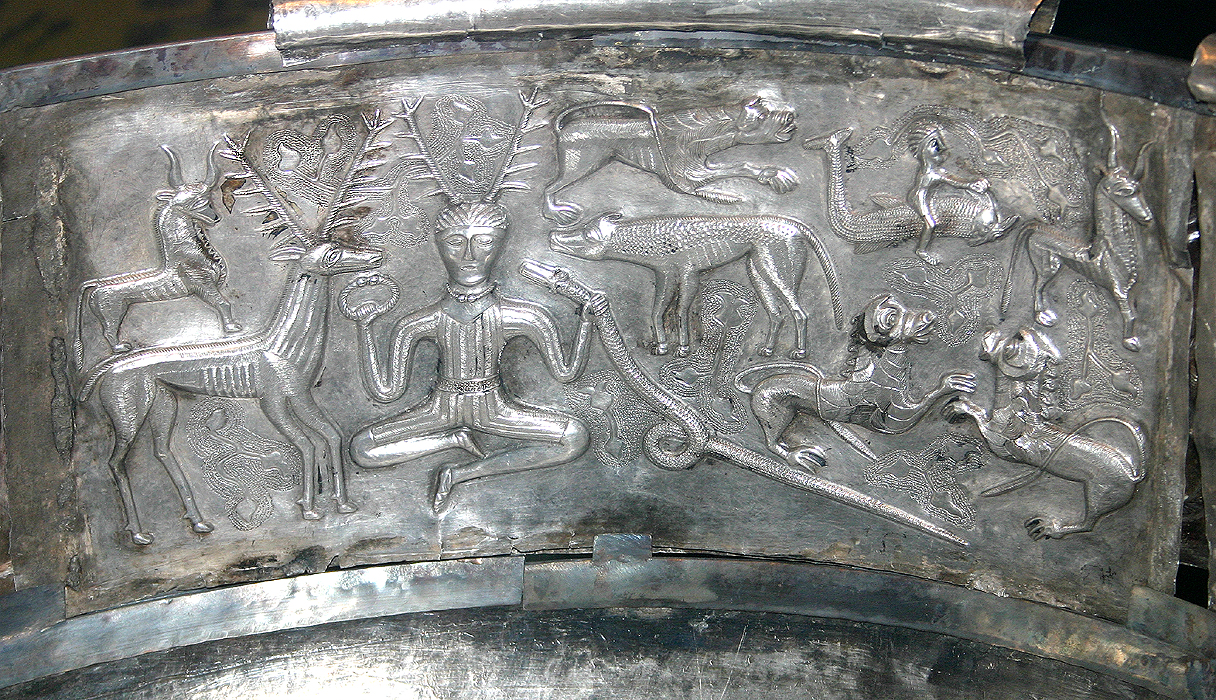
Inner panel A with the famous horned figure

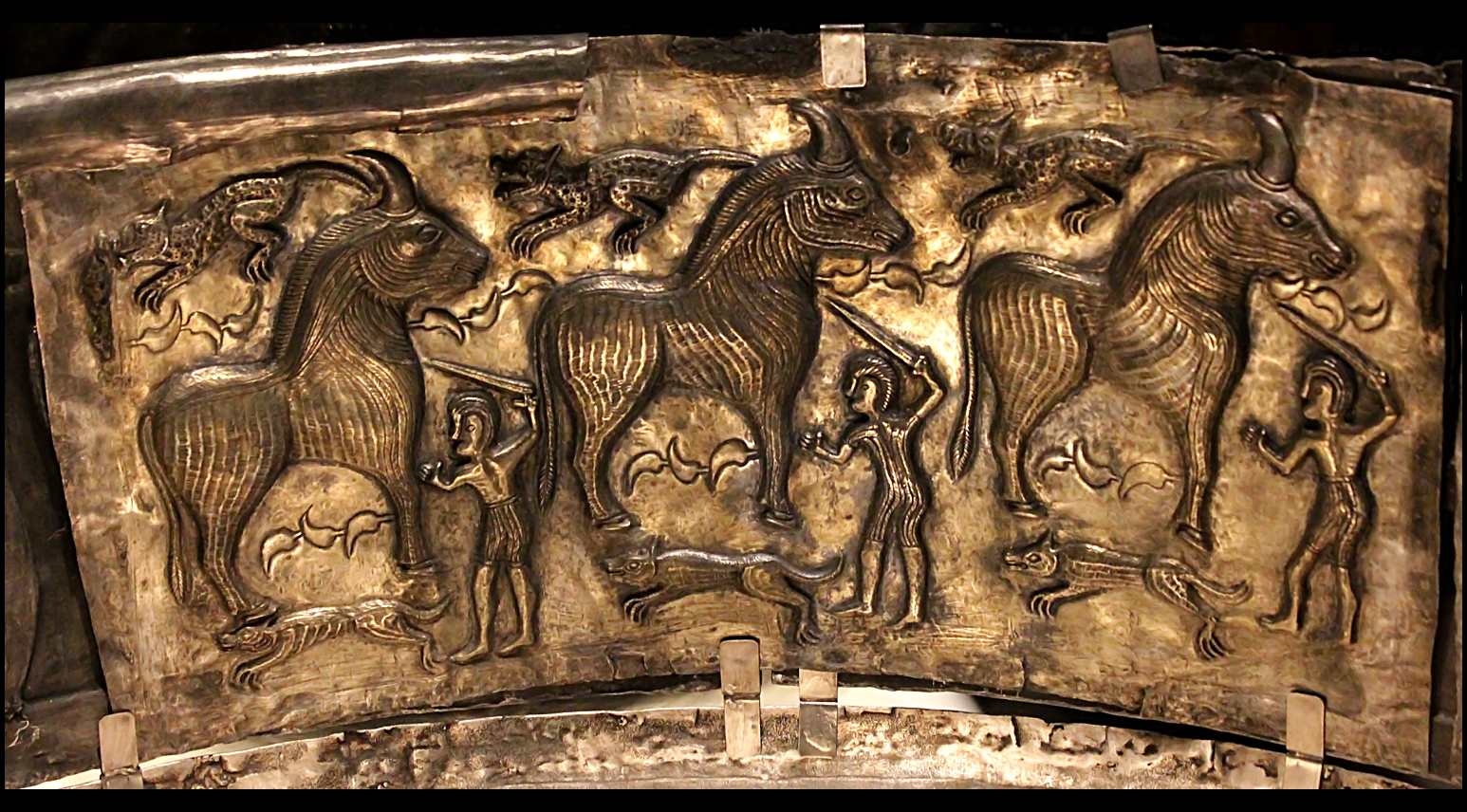
Inner panel D with bull-slaying (replica)

The Gundestrup cauldron is composed almost entirely of silver, but there is also a substantial amount of gold for the gilding, tin for the solder and glass for the figures' eyes. According to experimental evidence, the materials for the vessel were not added at the same time, so the cauldron can be considered as the work of artisans over a span of several hundred years. The quality of the repairs to the cauldron, of which there are many, is inferior to the original craftsmanship.

Silver was not a common material in Celtic art, and certainly not on this scale. Except sometimes for small pieces of jewellery, gold or bronze were more usual for prestige metalwork. At the time that the Gundestrup cauldron was created, silver was obtained through cupellation of lead / silver ores.

From comparisons of the concentration of lead isotopes with the silver work by other cultures, it seems that the silver came from multiple ore deposits, mostly from Celtic northern France and western Germany in the pre-Roman period. Lead isotope studies also indicate that the silver for manufacturing the plates was prepared by repeatedly melting ingots and/or scrap silver. Three to six distinct batches of recycled silver may have been used in making the vessel. Specifically, the circular "base plate" may have originated as a phalera, and it is commonly thought to have been positioned in the bottom of the bowl as a late addition, soldered in to repair a hole. By an alternative theory, this phalera was not initially part of the bowl, but instead formed part of the decorations of a wooden cover.

The gold can be sorted into two groups based on purity and separated by the concentration of silver and copper. The less pure gilding, which is thicker, can be considered a later repair, as the thinner, purer inlay adheres better to the silver. The adherence of the overall gold is quite poor. The lack of mercury from the gold analysis suggests that a fire-gilding technique was not used on the Gundestrup cauldron. The gilding appears to have instead been made by mechanical means, which explains the function of closely spaced punch marks on the gilded areas.

An examination of lead isotopes similar to the one used on the silver was employed for the tin. All of the samples of tin soldering are consistent in lead-isotope composition with ingots from Cornwall in western Britain. The tin used for soldering the plates and bowl together, as well as the glass eyes, is very uniform in its high purity.

Finally, the glass inlays of the Gundestrup cauldron have been determined through the use of X-ray fluorescence radiation to be of a soda-lime type composition. The glass contained elements that can be attributed to calcareous sand and mineral soda, typical of the east coast of the Mediterranean region. The analyses also narrowed down the production time of the glass to between the second century BC and first century AD.

== Flow of raw material ==
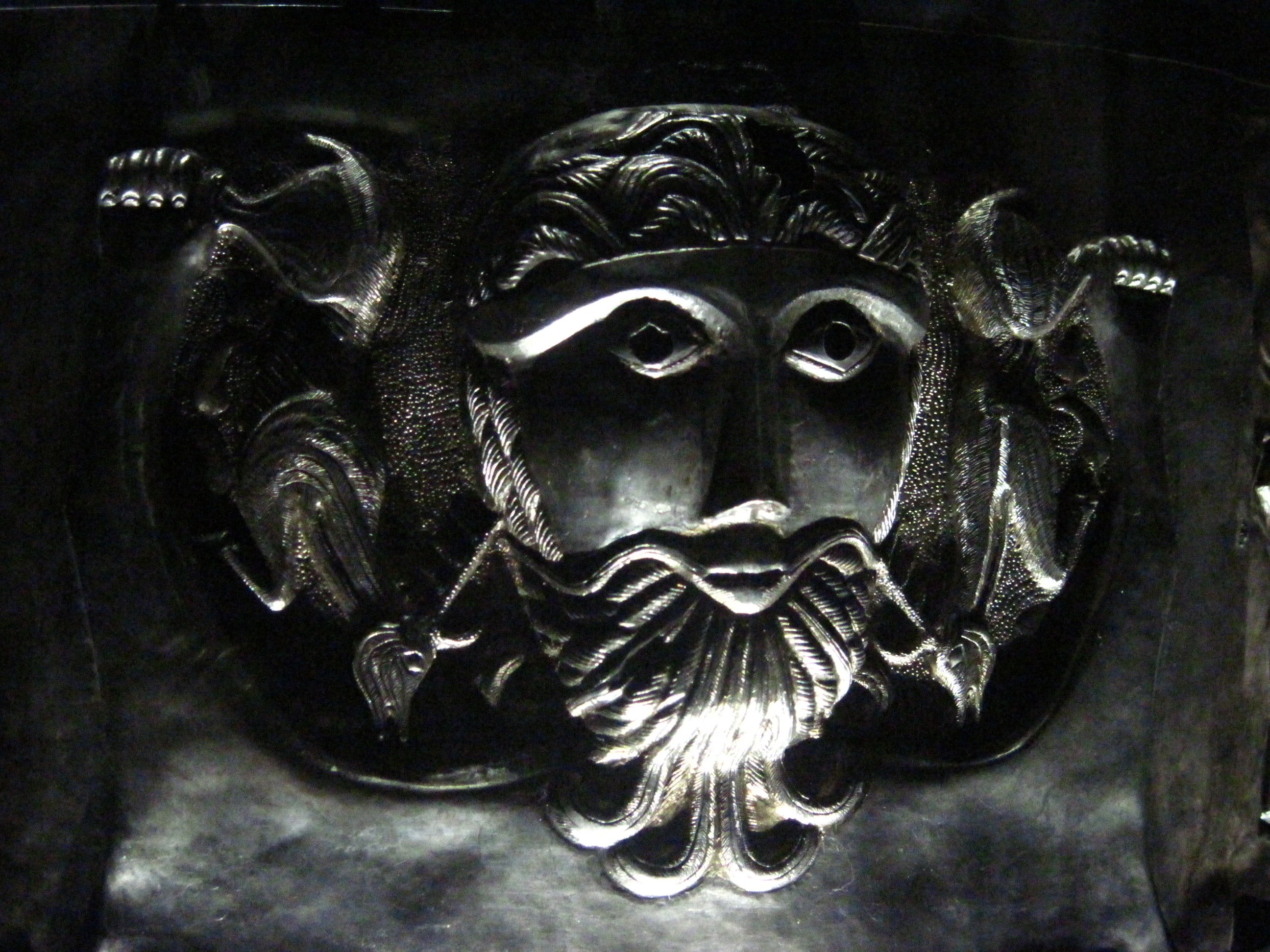
Exterior plate d

The workflow of the manufacturing process consisted of a few steps that required a great amount of skill. Batches of silver were melted in crucibles with the addition of copper for a subtler alloy. The melted silver was cast into flat ingots and hammered into intermediate plates.

For the relief work, the sheet-silver was annealed to allow shapes to be beaten into high repoussé; these rough shapes were then filled with pitch from the back to make them firm enough for further detailing with punches and tracers. The pitch was melted out, areas of pattern were gilded, and the eyes of the larger figures were inlaid with glass. The plates were probably worked in a flat form and later bent into curves to solder them together.

It is generally agreed that the Gundestrup cauldron was the work of multiple silversmiths. Using scanning electron microscopy, Benner Larson has identified 15 different punches used on the plates, falling into three distinct tool sets. No individual plate has marks from more than one of these groups, and this fits with previous attempts at stylistic attribution, which identify at least three different silversmiths. Multiple artisans would also explain the highly variable purity and thickness of the silver.

== Origins ==
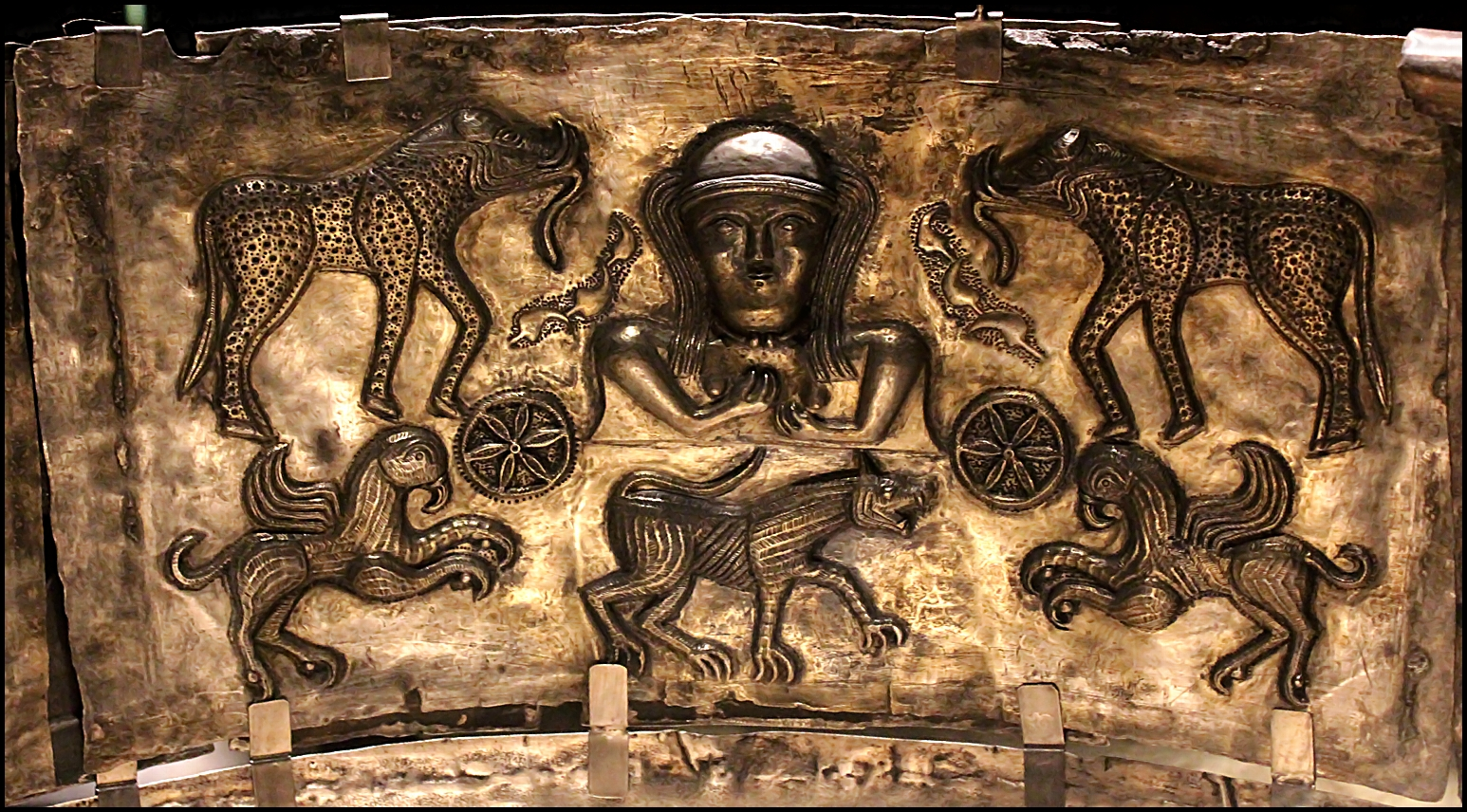
Interior plate B, replica

The silverworking techniques used in the cauldron are unknown from the Celtic world, but are consistent with the renowned Thracian sheet-silver tradition. The scenes depicted are not distinctively Thracian, but certain elements of composition, decorative motifs, and illustrated items (such as the shoelaces on the antlered figure) identify it as Thracian work.

Taylor and Bergquist have postulated that the Celtic tribe known as the Scordisci commissioned the cauldron from native Thracian silversmiths. According to classical historians, the Cimbri, a Teutonic tribe, went south from the lower Elbe region and attacked the Scordisci in 118 BC. After withstanding several defeats at the hands of the Romans, the Cimbri retreated north, possibly taking with them this cauldron to settle in Himmerland, where the vessel was found.

According to Olmsted (2001) the art style of the Gundestrup cauldron is that utilized in Armorican coinage dating to 75–55 BCE, as exemplified in the billon coins of the Coriosolites. This art style is unique to northwest Gaul and is largely confined to the region between the Seine and the Loire, a region in which, according to Caesar, the wealthy sea-faring Veneti played a dominant and hegemonic role. Agreeing with this area of production, determined by the art style, is the fact that the

"lead isotope compositions of the [Gundestrup] cauldron plates" [mostly included] "the same silver as used in northern France for the Coriosolite coins".

Not only does the Gundestrup cauldron enlighten us about this coin-driven art style, where the larger-metalwork smiths were also the mint-masters producing the coins, but the cauldron also portrays cultural items, such as swords, armor, and shields, found and produced in this same cultural area, confirming the agreement between art style and metal analysis. If as Olmsted (2001) and Hachmann (1990) suggest, the Veneti also produced the silver phalerae, found on the Isle of Sark, as well as the Helden phalera, then there are a number of silver items of the type exemplified by the Gundestrup cauldron originating in northwest France, dating to just before the Roman conquest.

Nielsen believes that the question of origin is the wrong one to ask and can produce misleading results. Because of the widespread migration of numerous ethnic groups like the Celts and Teutonic peoples and events like Roman expansion and subsequent Romanization, it is highly unlikely that only one ethnic group was responsible for the development of the Gundestrup cauldron. Instead, the make and art of the cauldron can be thought of as the product of a fusion of cultures, each inspiring and expanding upon one another. In the end, based on accelerator datings from beeswax found on the back of the plates, Nielsen concludes that the vessel was created within the Roman Iron Age. However, an addendum to Nielson's article indicates that results from the Leibniz Lab on the same beeswax dated some 400 years earlier than reported in his article.

According to Ronald Hutton, because the cauldron's source metals have been traced to the Black Sea region, and depicts elephants, the cauldron should no longer be considered [strictly] Celtic.

== Iconography ==
=== Base plate ===
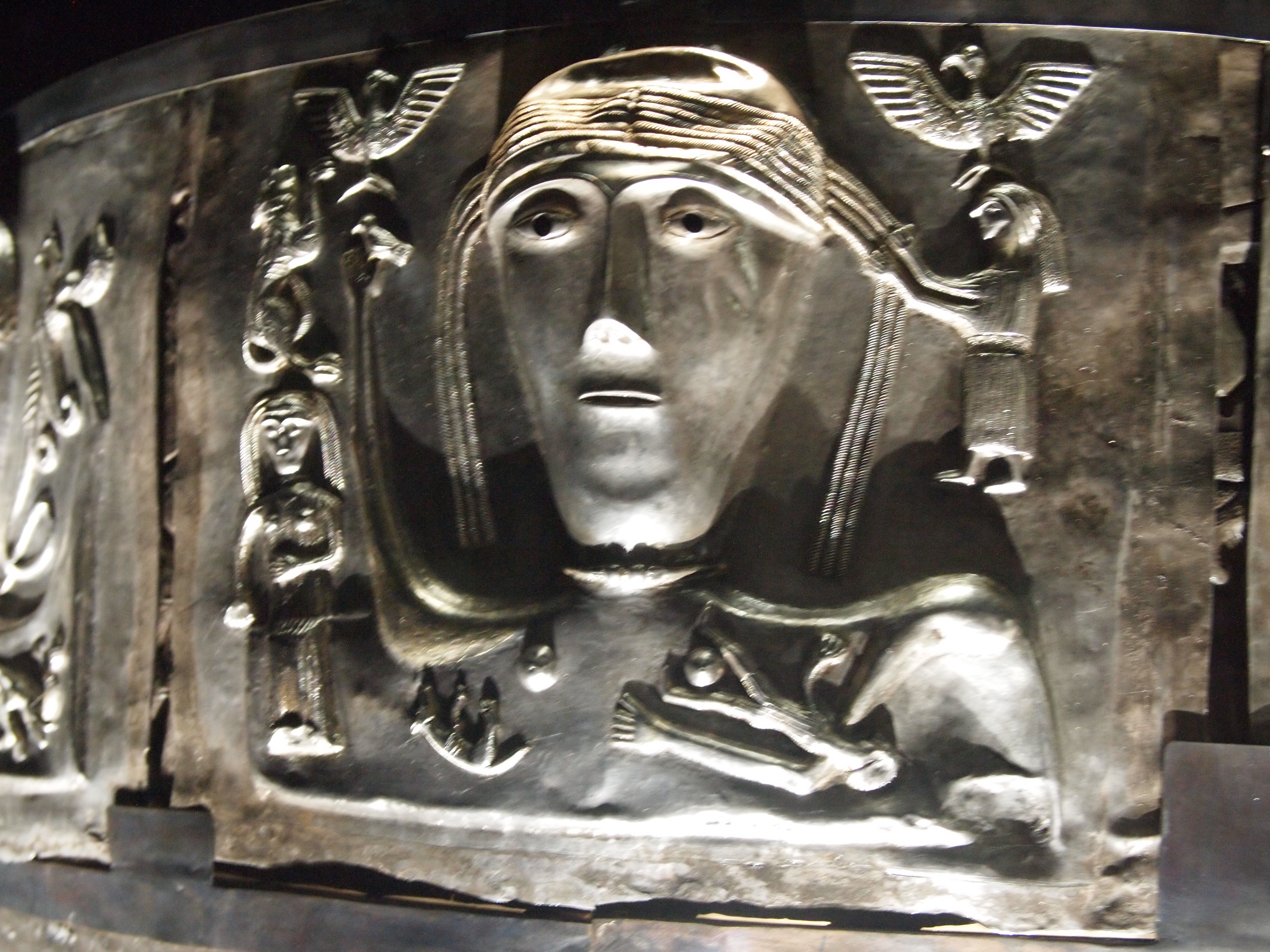
Exterior plate f, with torc-wearing head

The decorated medallion on the circular base plate depicts a bull. Above the back of the bull is a female figure wielding a sword; three dogs are also portrayed, one over the bull's head and another under its hooves. Presumably all of these figures are in combat; the third dog, located beneath the bull and near its tail, seems to be dead, and is only faintly shown in engraving, and the bull may have been brought down. Below the bull is scrolling ivy that draws from classical Greco-Roman art. (Note: NMD: "The bullfight") The horns of the bull are missing, but there is a hole right through the head where they were originally fitted; perhaps they were gold. The head of the bull rises entirely clear of the plate, and the medallion is considered the most accomplished part of the cauldron in technical and artistic terms.

=== Exterior plates ===
Each of the seven exterior plates centrally depicts a bust. Plates a, b, c, and d show bearded male figures, and the remaining three are female.

Plate	Depicts
a	A bearded man holds in each hand a much smaller figure by the arm. Each of those two reach upward toward a small boar. Under the feet of the figures (on the shoulders of the larger man) are a dog on the left side and a winged horse on the right side.
b	A bearded male figure holds a sea-horse or dragon in each hand. Below this is a dragon like monster with two heads at each end of its body. Both heads have arms which are grabing two people.
c	A bearded male figure raises his empty fists. On his right shoulder is a man in a "boxing" position, and on his left shoulder, there is a leaping figure with a small horseman underneath.
d	A bearded male figure holding a stag by the hind quarters in each hand.
e	A female figure is flanked by two smaller male busts.
f	A female figure holds a bird in her upraised right hand. Her left arm is horizontal, supporting a man and a dog lying on its back. Two birds of prey are situated on either side of her head. Her hair is being plaited by a small woman on the right.
g	A female figure has her arms crossed. On her right shoulder, a scene of a someone holding a boar is shown. On her left shoulder is a leaping figure similar to the one on plate c.

=== Interior plates ===
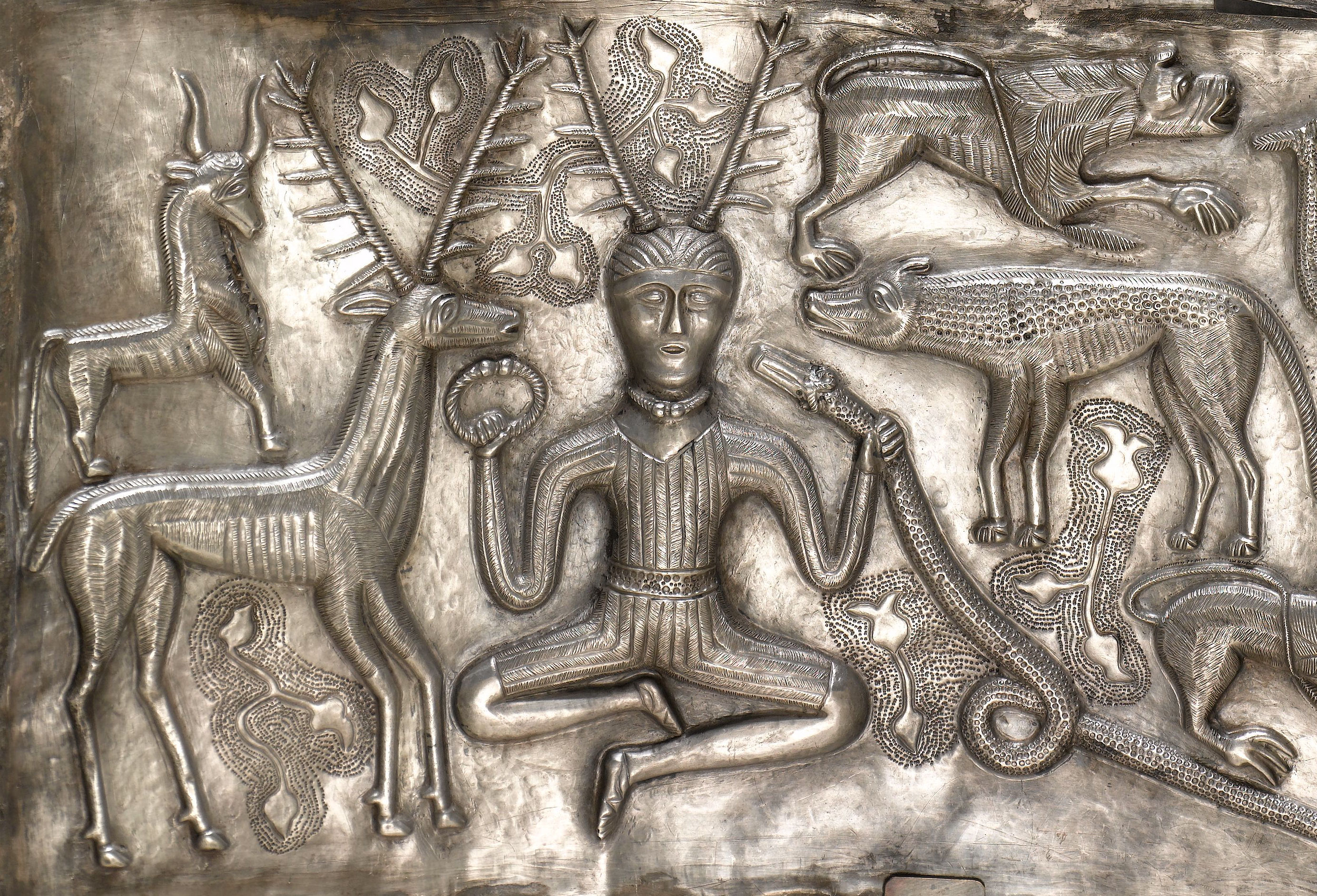
Detail from interior plate A

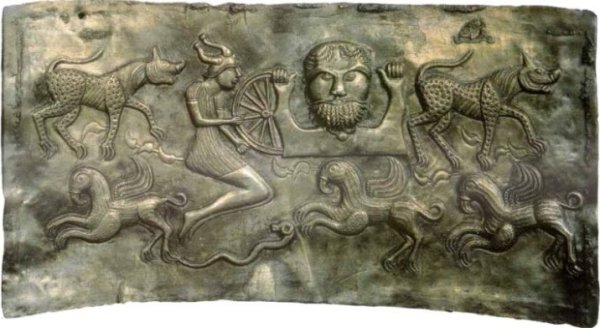
Interior plate C

Plate	Depicts
A	A beardless male figure wearing a cap with deer antlers is seated in the center of the plate; he is often identified as Cernunnos. In his right hand, he holds a torc, and with his left hand he grips a horned serpent a little below the head. To the left is a stag with antlers that are identical in size and shape to the Cernunnos figure's cap. Surrounding the scene are other canine, feline, and bovine animals, some but not all facing the male figure, as well as a human riding a dolphin. Between the antlers of the god is an unknown ivy-like motif, either an ivy vine or possibly a tree branch. It is thought to most likely be just a standard background decoration.
B	A large bust of a torc-wearing female is flanked by two six-spoked wheels, and what seem to be two elephants and two griffins. A feline or hound is underneath the bust. In northwest Gaulish coinage from 150 to 50 BC, such wheels often indicate a chariot, so the scene could be seen as a goddess in an elephant biga.
C	A large bust of a bearded male figure holding on to a broken wheel at the centre. A smaller, leaping figure with a horned helmet is also holding the rim of the wheel. Under the leaping figure is a horned serpent. The group is surrounded by three griffins facing left below, and above, two strange animals who look like hyenas, facing right. The wheel's spokes are rendered asymmetrically, but judging from the lower half, the wheel may have had twelve spokes.
D	A bull-slaying scene, with the same composition repeated three times across the plate; the only place where such repetition appears on the cauldron. Three large bulls are arranged in a row, facing right, and each of them is attacked by a man with a sword. A feline and a dog, both running to the left, appear respectively over and below each bull. Note that after the Stowe version of the Táin, Medb's men run forward to kill the Donn bull after his fight with Medb's "white-horned" bull, whom he kills.
E lower half	A line of warriors bearing spears and shields march to the left, bringing up the rear is a warrior with no shield, bearing a sword, and wearing a boar-crested helmet which resembles helmets from later Germanic cultures. Behind him are three carnyx players. In front of this group a dog leaps up, perhaps holding them back. Behind the dog, at the left side of the scene, a figure over twice the size of the others holds a man upside down, apparently with ease, and apparently is about to immerse him in a barrel or cauldron.
E upper half	Warriors on horseback with crested helmets and spears ride away to the right, with at the right a horned serpent, fitted in above the tops of the carnyxes, who is perhaps leading them. The two lines are below and above what appears to be a tree, still in leaf, lying sideways. This is now most often interpreted as a scene where fallen warriors are dipped into a cauldron to be reborn into their next life, or afterlife. This can be paralleled in later Welsh literature. (Note: NMD: "The cauldron of fate?")

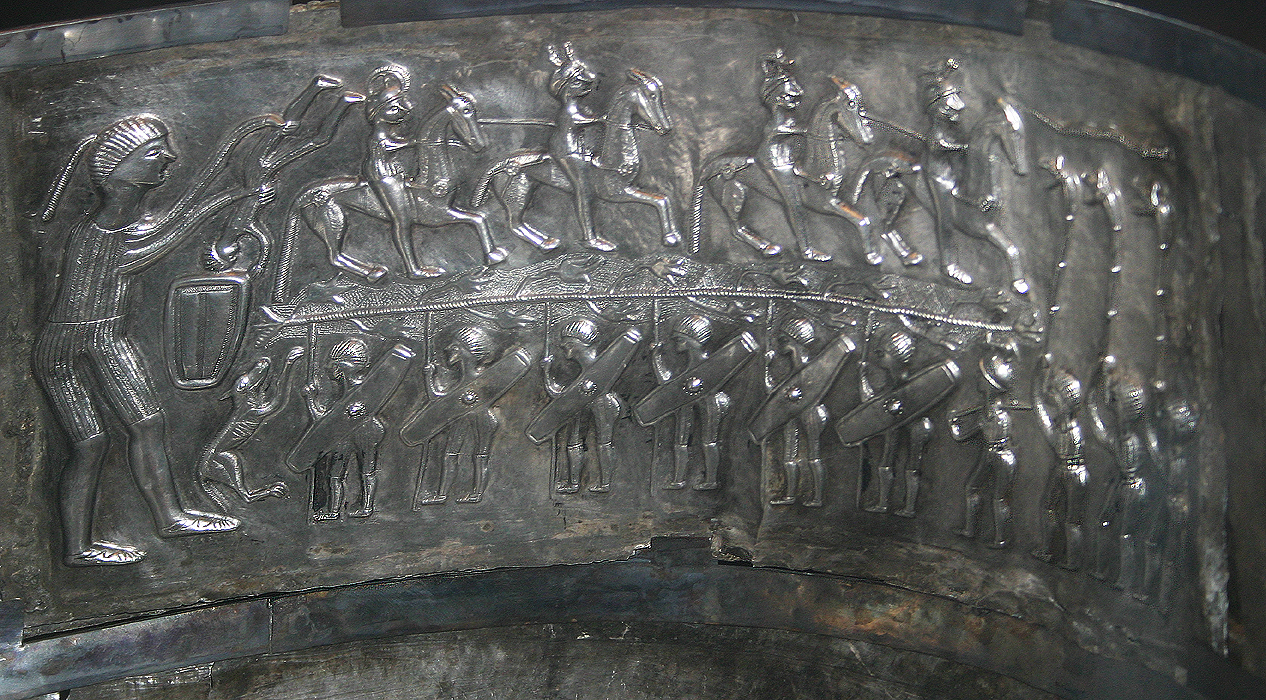
Interior plate E

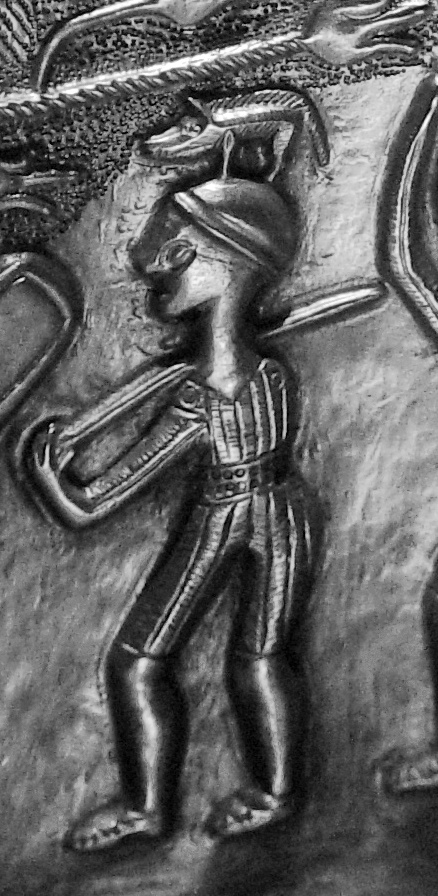
Boar-helmeted figure

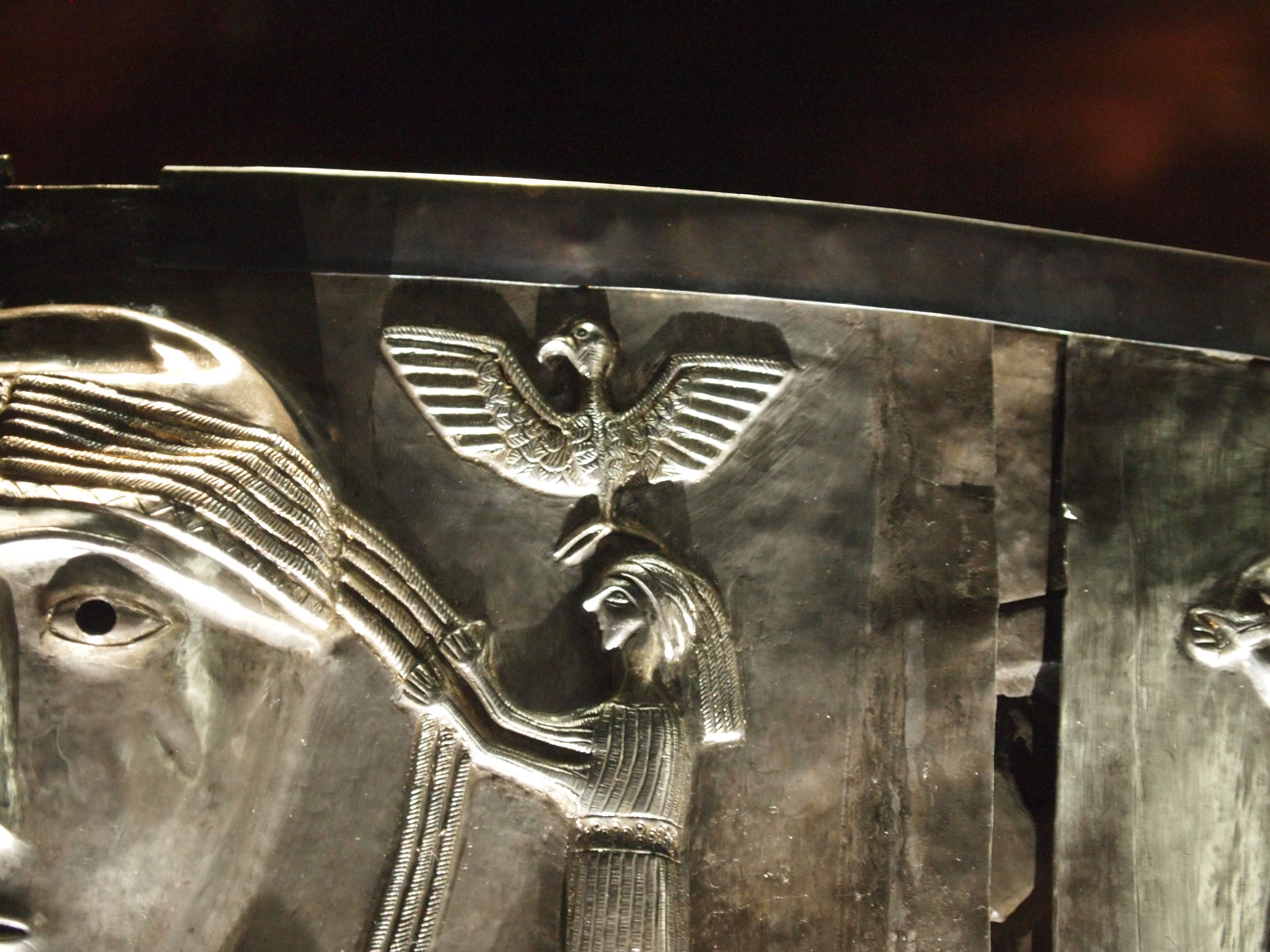
Detail

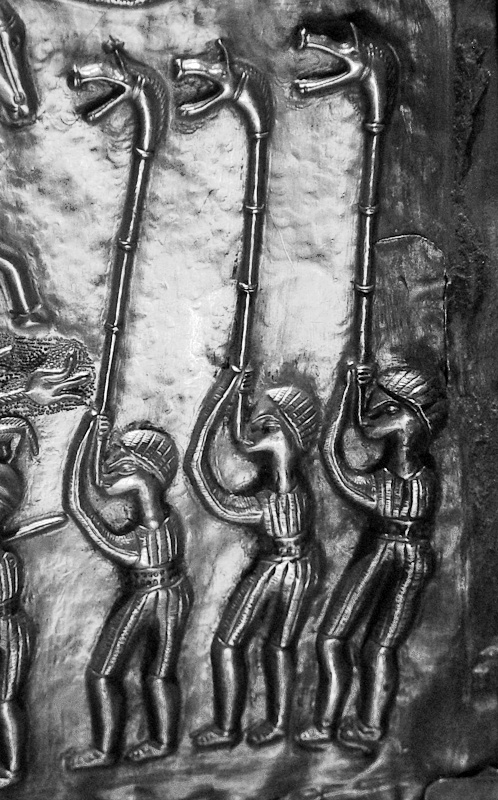
The carnyx players

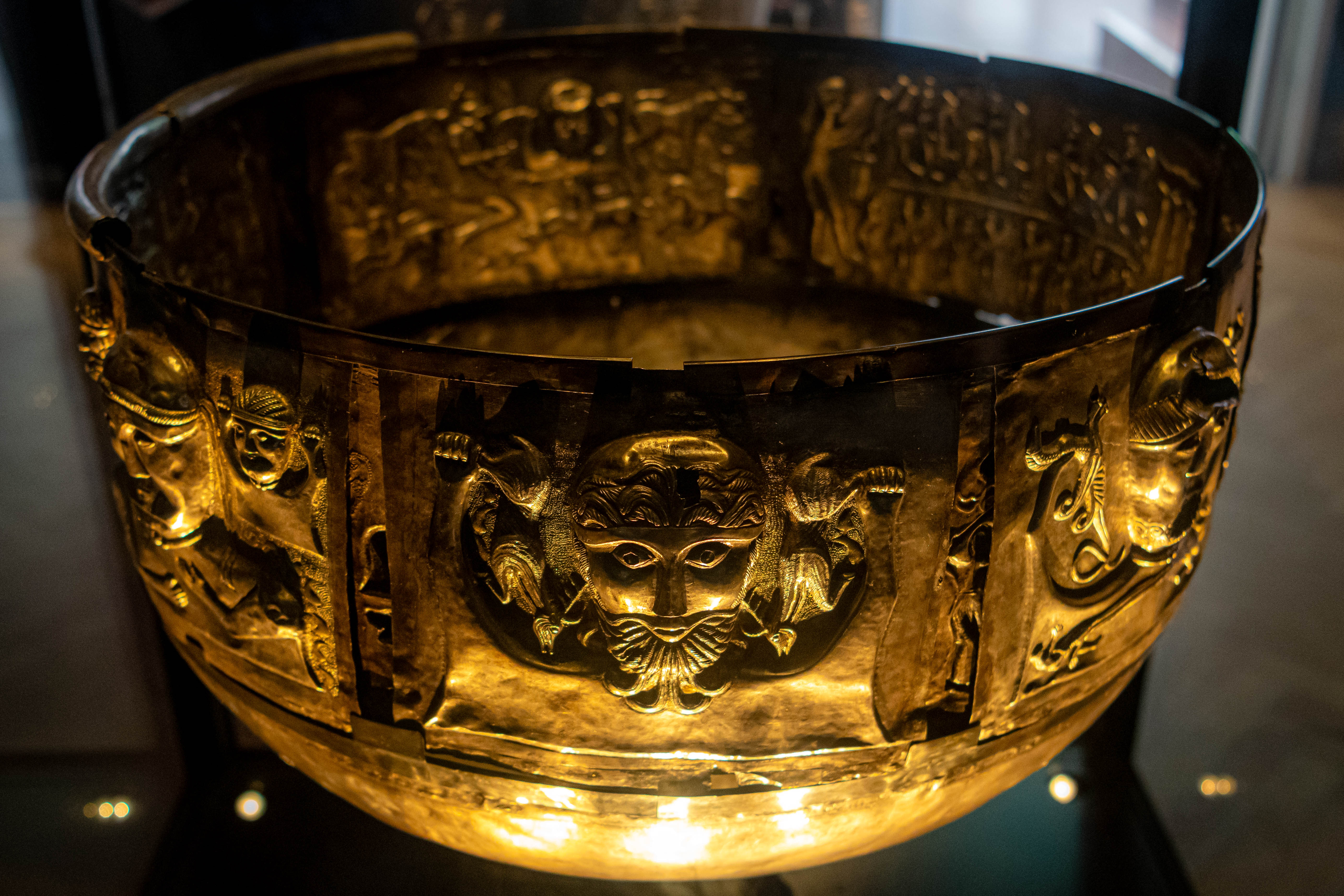

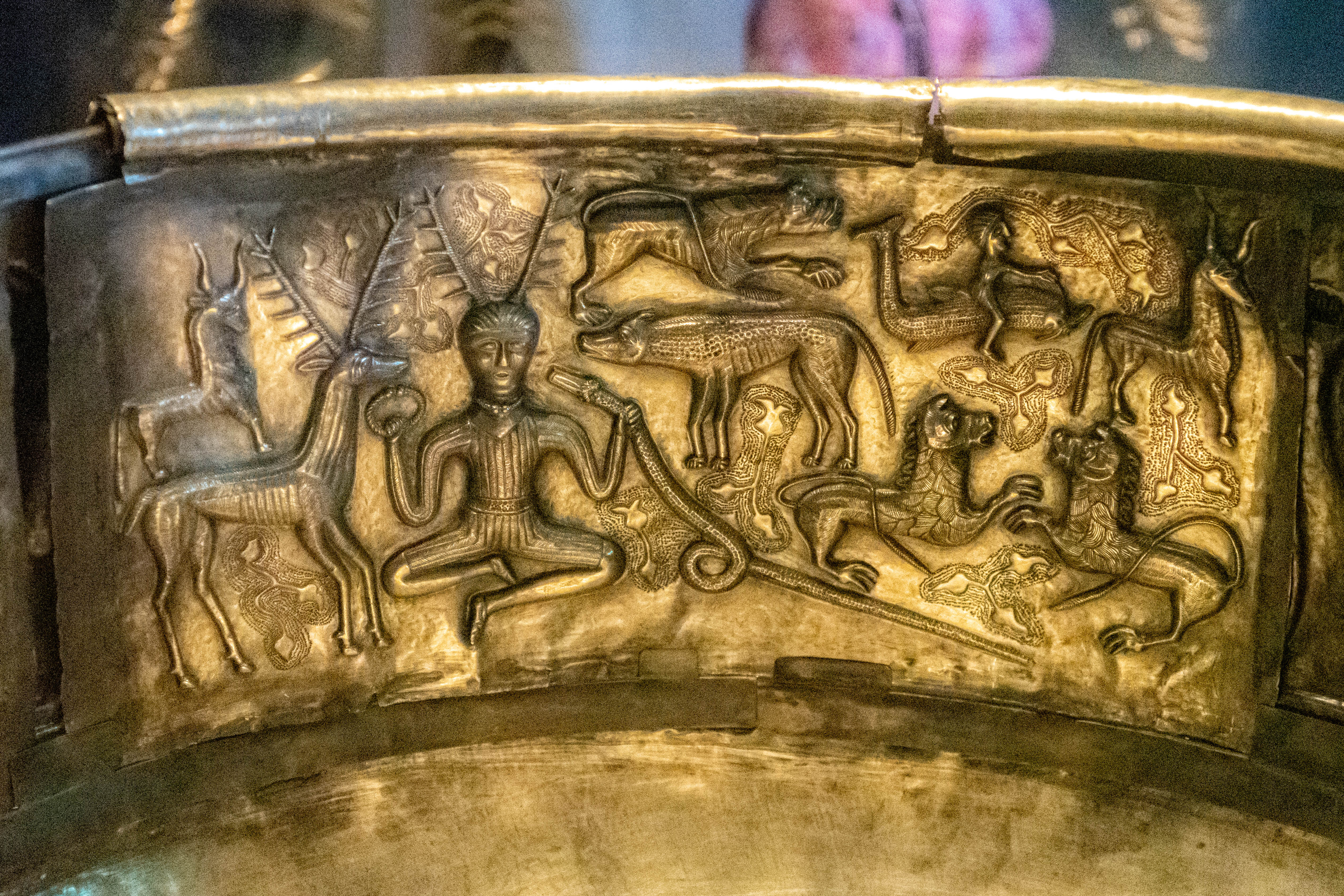

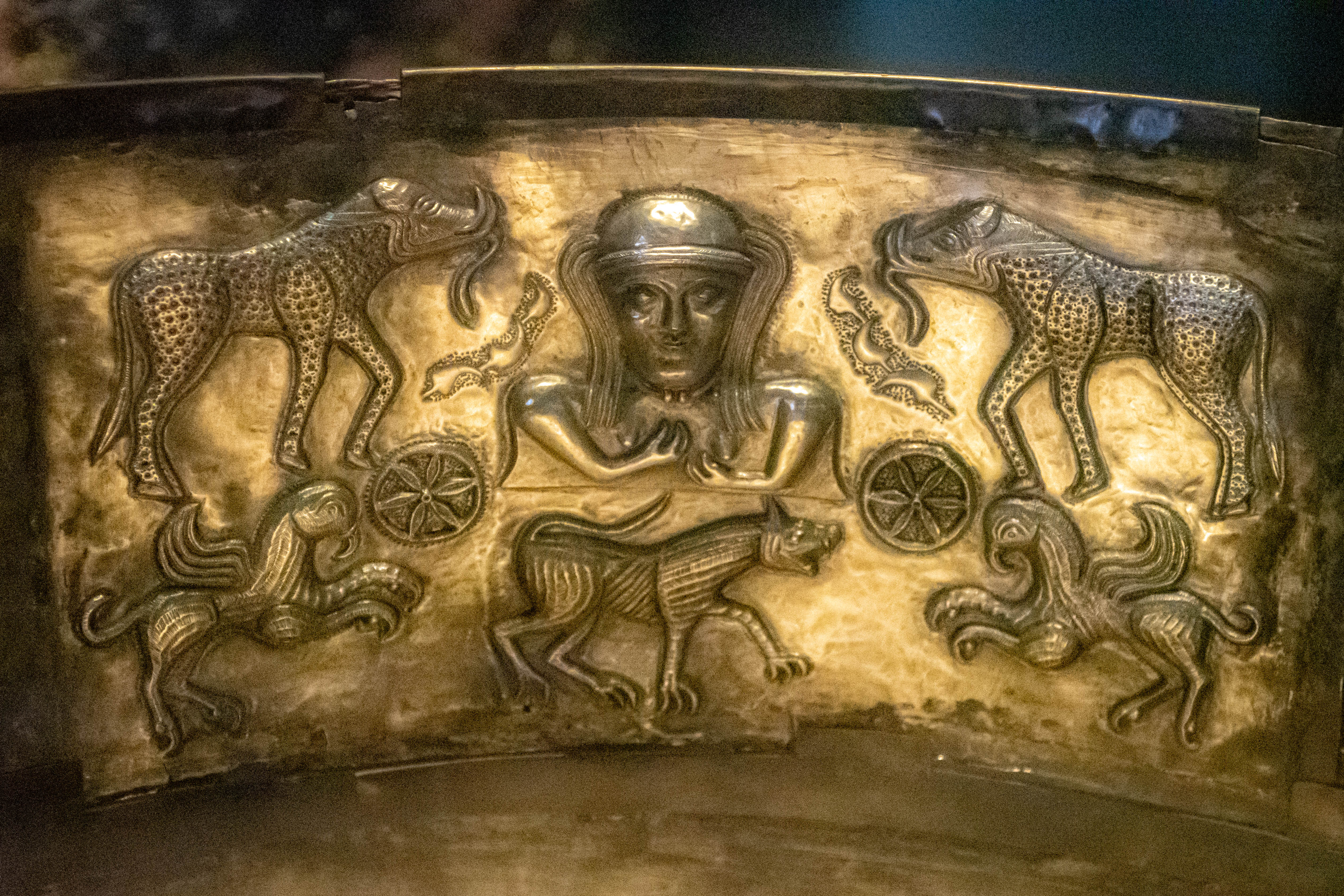

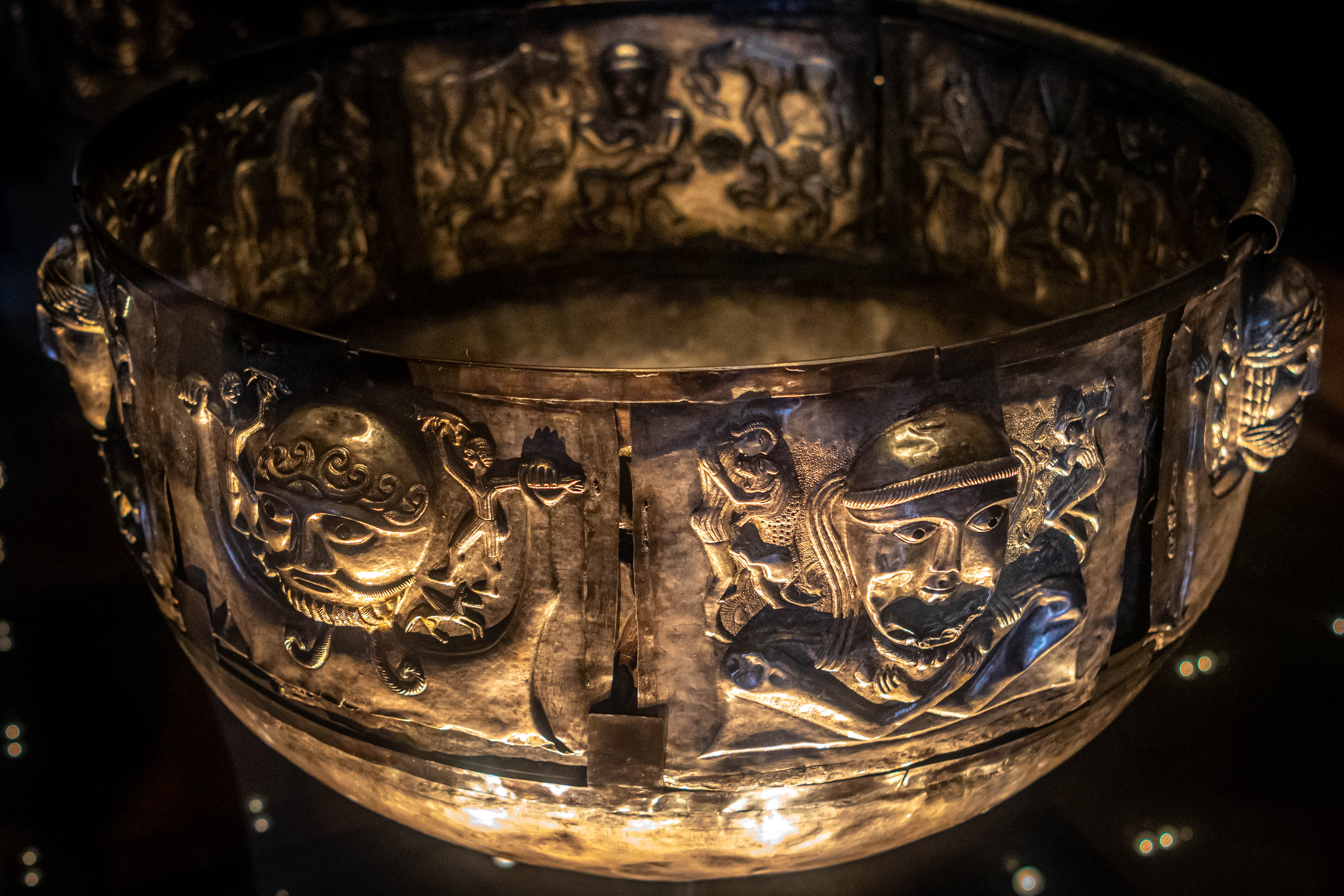

== Interpretation and parallels ==
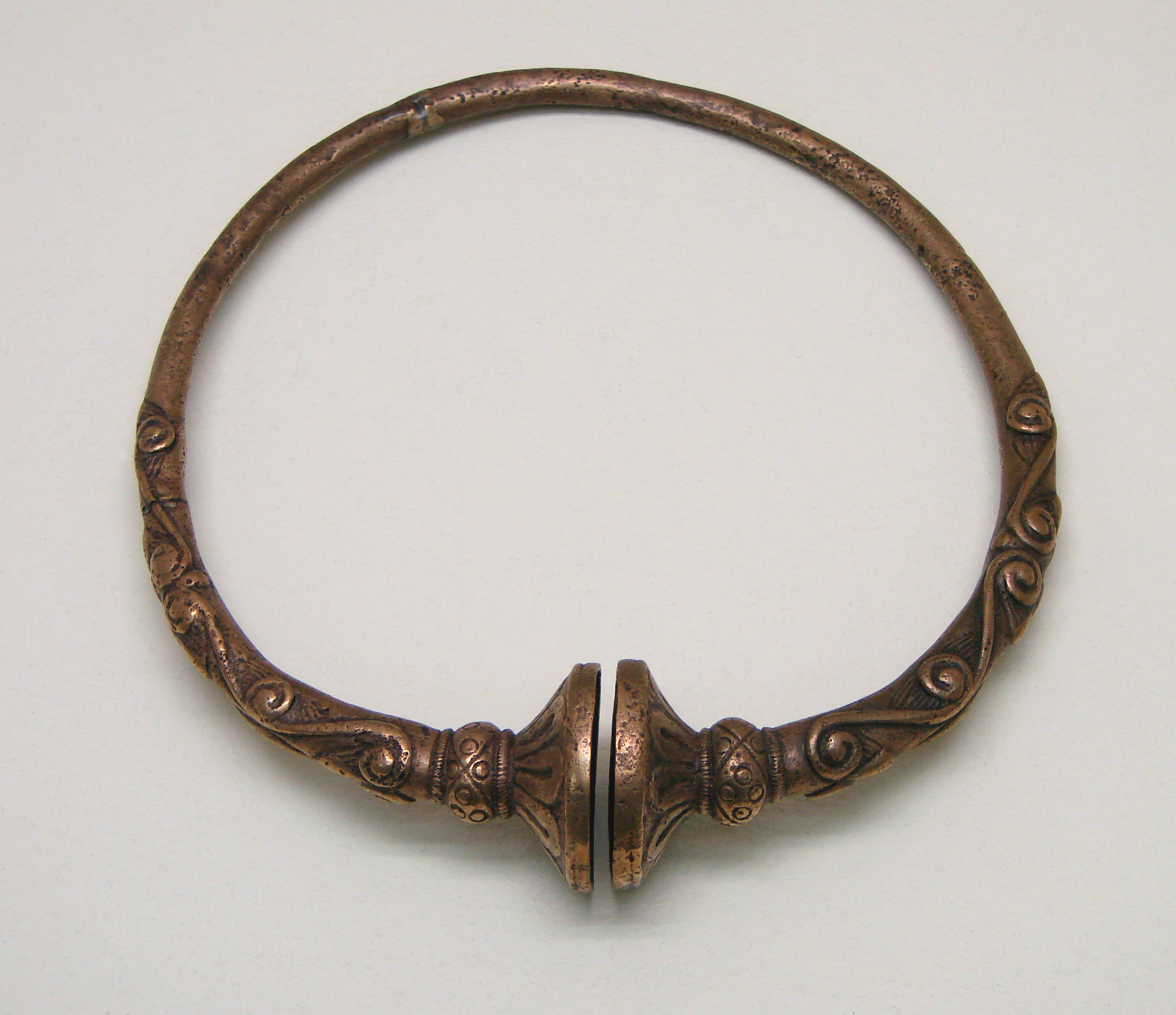
Bronze 4th-century BC buffer-type Celtic torc from France

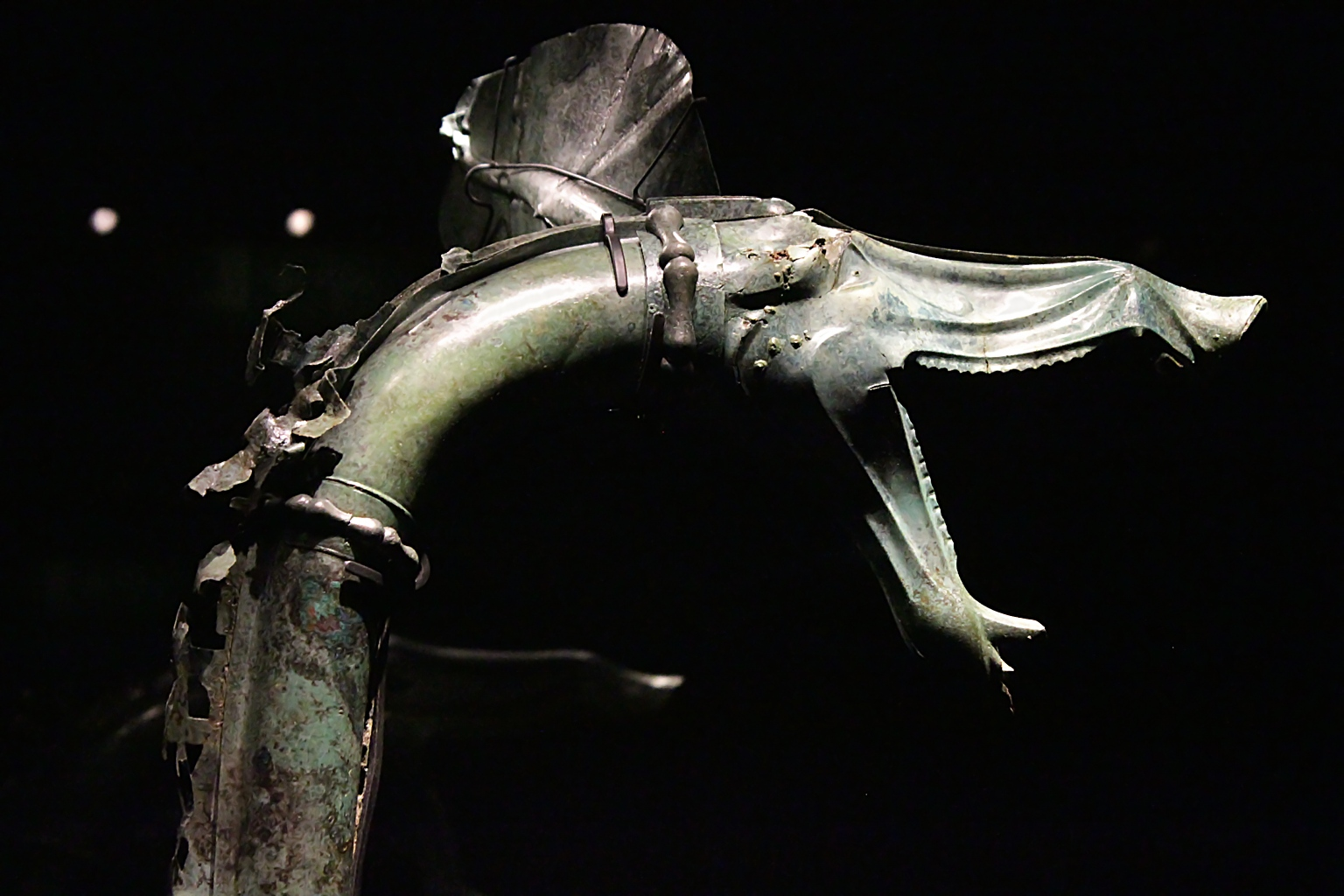
Carnyx head from the Tintignac group

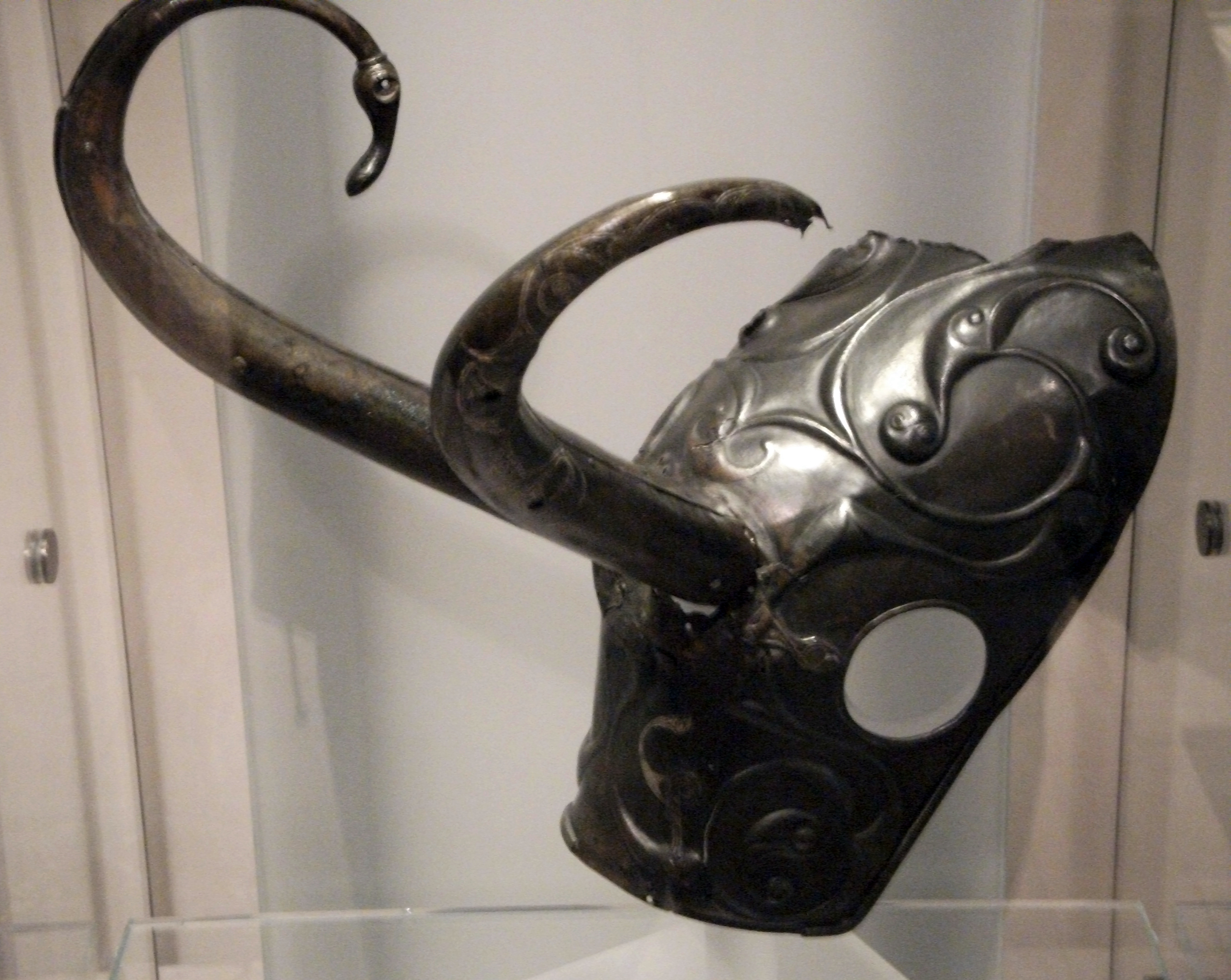
Torrs Pony-cap and Horns

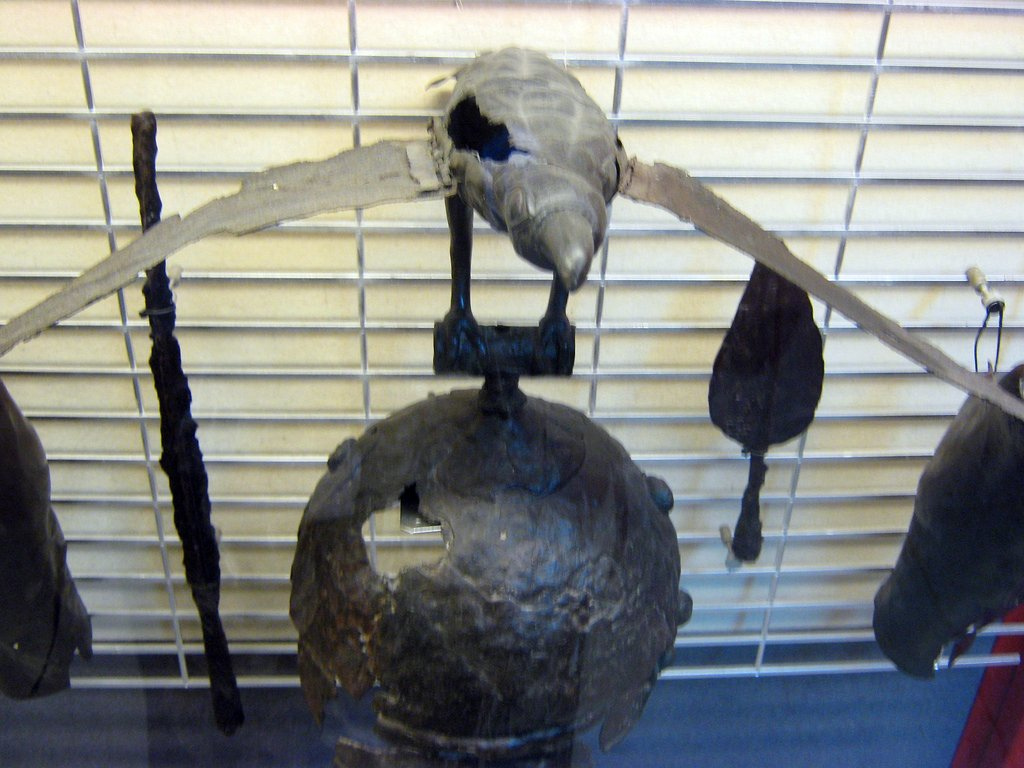
Celtic helmet from Satu Mare, Romania with raven crest, around 4th century BC

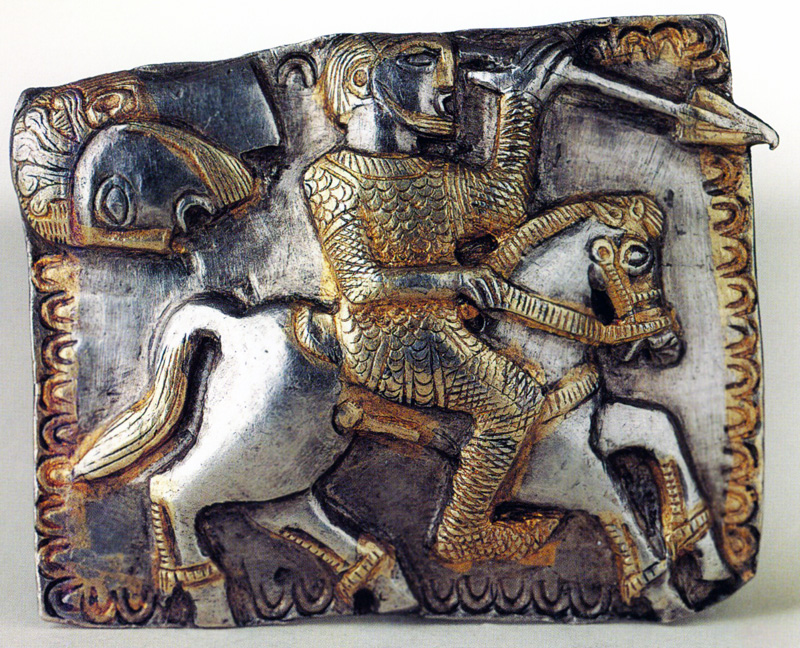
Thracian plaque with the Thracian horseman

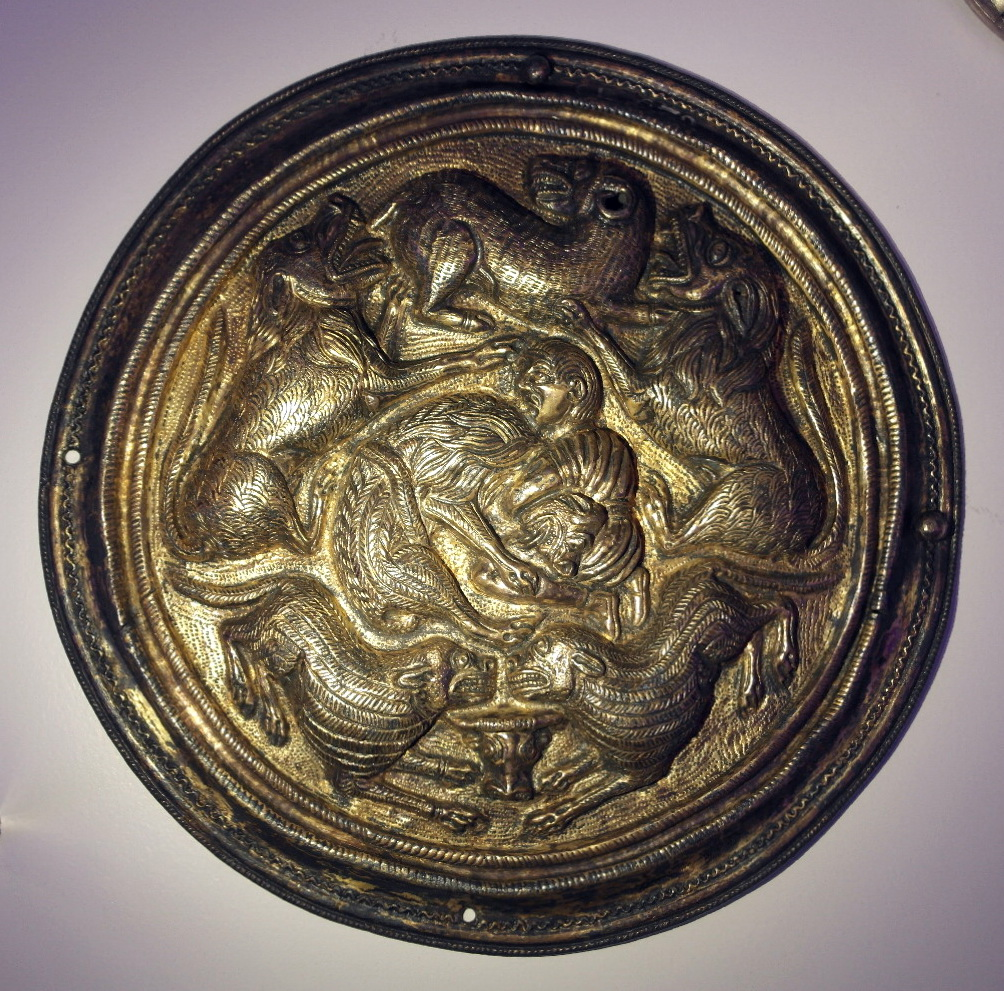
Thracian disc (the Sierschijf van Helden) found in the Netherlands

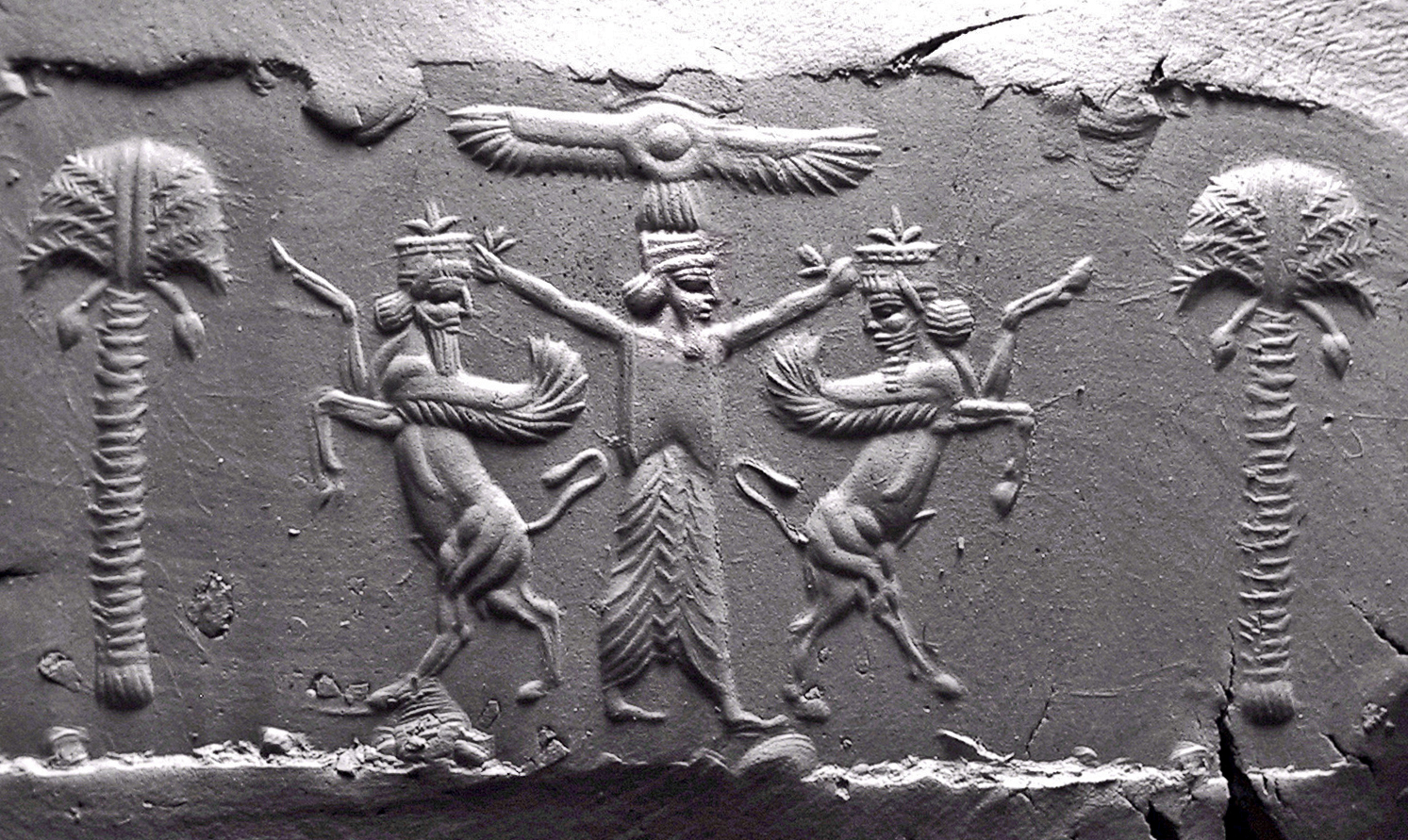
Achaemenid seal impression with Master of Animals motif; the Persian king subduing two Mesopotamian lamassu

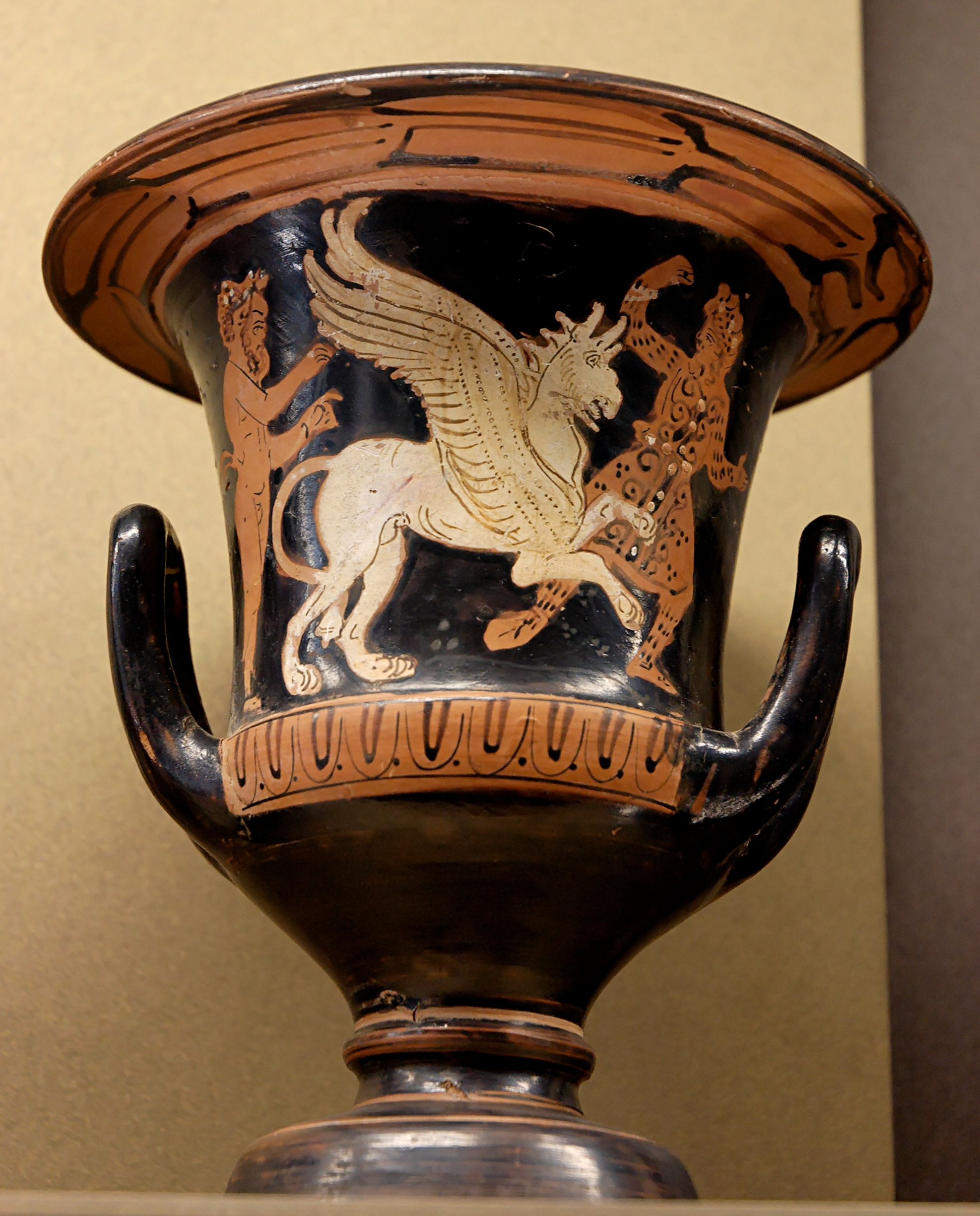
Griffin on an Ancient Greek vase

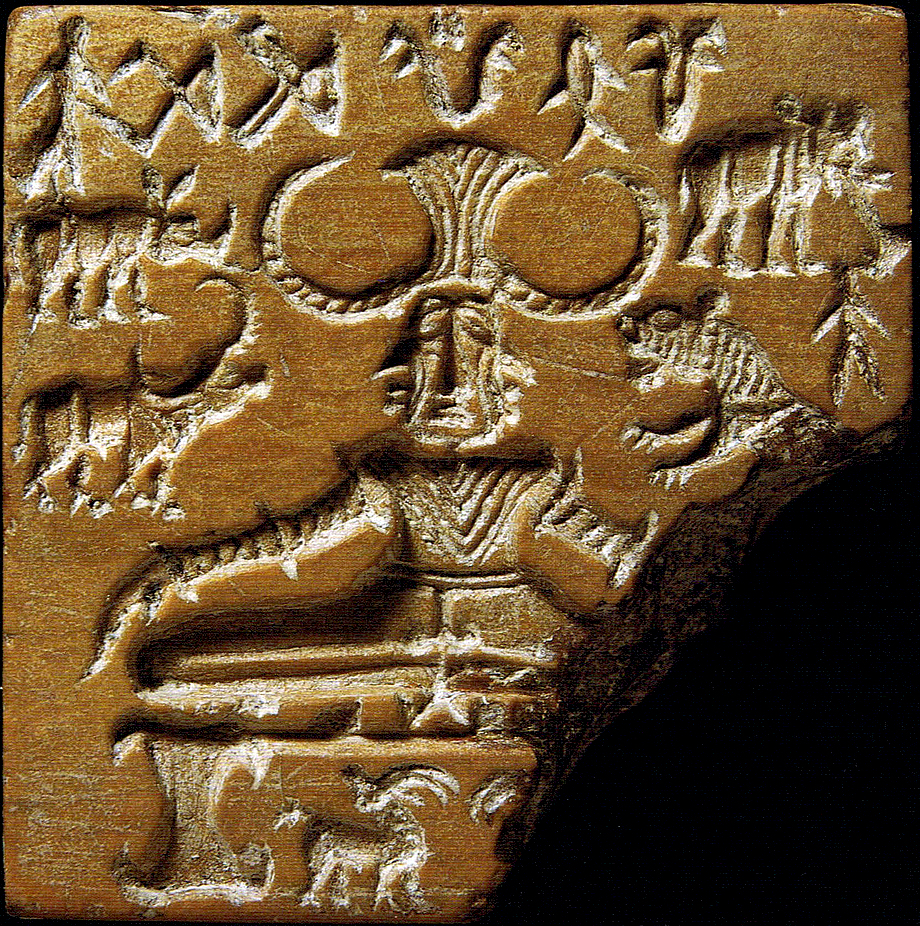
The Pashupati Seal (Lord of Animals) from the Indus Valley civilization is remarkably similar to the antlered figure of plate A.

For many years, some scholars have interpreted the cauldron's images in terms of the Celtic pantheon, and Celtic mythology as it is presented in much later literature in Celtic languages from the British Isles. Others regard the latter interpretations with great suspicion. Much less controversially, there are clear parallels between details of the figures and Iron Age Celtic artifacts excavated by archaeology.

Other details of the iconography clearly derive from the art of the ancient Near East, and there are intriguing parallels with ancient India and later Hindu deities and their stories. Scholars are mostly content to regard the former as motifs borrowed purely for their visual appeal, without carrying over anything much of their original meaning, but despite the distance some have attempted to relate the latter to wider traditions remaining from Proto-Indo-European religion.

=== Celtic archaeology ===
Among the most specific details that are clearly Celtic are the group of carnyx players. The carnyx war horn was known from Roman descriptions of the Celts in battle and Trajan's Column, and a few pieces are known from archaeology, their number greatly increased by finds at Tintignac in France in 2004.

"Their trumpets again are of a peculiar barbarian kind; they blow into them and produce a harsh sound which suits the tumult of war".

Another detail that is easily matched to archaeology is the torc worn by several figures, clearly of the "buffer" type, a fairly common Celtic artefact found in Western Europe, most often France, from the period the cauldron is thought to have been made.

Other details with more tentative Celtic links are the long swords carried by some figures, and the horned and antlered helmets or head-dresses and the boar crest worn on their helmet by some warriors. These can be related to Celtic artefacts such as a helmet with a raptor crest from Romania, the Waterloo Helmet, Torrs Pony-cap and Horns and various animal figures including boars, of uncertain function. The shield bosses, spurs and horse harness also relate to Celtic examples.

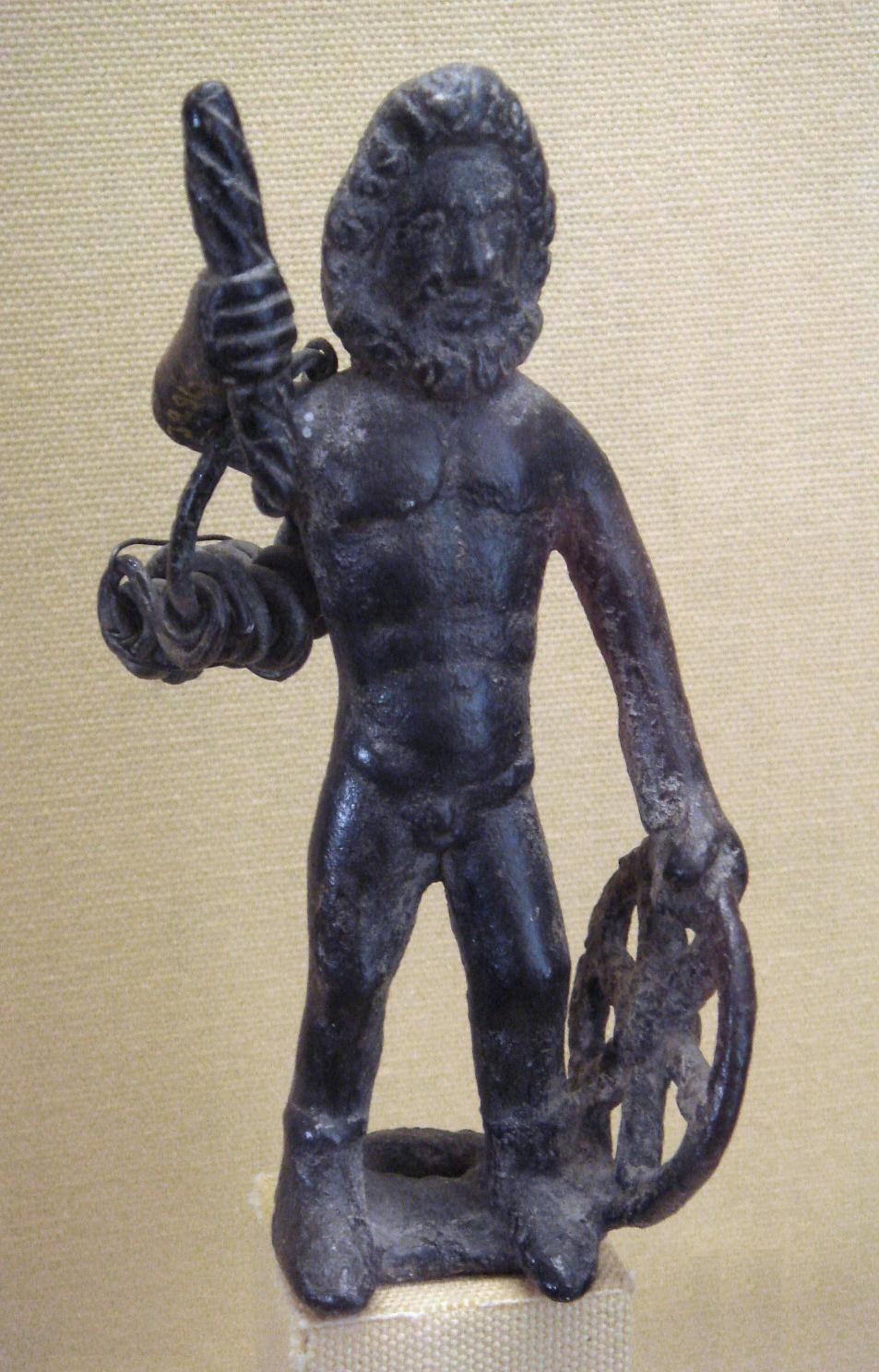
Gallo-Roman figure of Taranis/Jupiter with his wheel and thunderbolt, and carrying torcs

The antlered figure in plate A has been commonly identified as Cernunnos, who is named (the only source for the name) on the 1st-century Gallo-Roman Pillar of the Boatmen, where he is shown as an antlered figure with torcs hanging from his antlers. Possibly the lost portion below his bust showed him seated cross-legged as the figure on the cauldron is. Otherwise there is evidence of a horned god from several cultures.

The figure holding the broken wheel in plate C is more tentatively thought to be Taranis, the solar or thunder "wheel-god" named by Lucian and represented in a number of Iron Age images; there are also many wheels that seem to have been amulets.

=== Near East and Asia ===
The many animals depicted on the cauldron include elephants, a dolphin, leopard-like felines, and various fantastic animals, as well as animals that are widespread across Eurasia, such as snakes, cattle, deer, boars and birds. Celtic art often includes animals, but not often in fantastic forms with wings and aspects of different animals combined. There are exceptions to this, some when motifs are clearly borrowed, as the boy riding a dolphin is borrowed from Greek art, and others that are more native, like the ram-headed horned snake who appears three times on the cauldron. The art of Thrace often shows animals, most often powerful and fierce ones, many of which are also very common in the ancient Near East, or the Scythian art of the Eurasian steppe, whose mobile owners provided a route for the very rapid transmission of motifs and objects between the civilizations of Asia and Europe.

In particular, the two figures standing in profile flanking the large head on exterior plate F, each with a bird with outstretched wings just above their head, clearly resemble a common motif in ancient Assyrian and Persian art, down to the long garments they wear. The figure is usually the ruler, and the wings belong to a symbolic representation of a deity protecting him. Other plates show griffins borrowed from Ancient Greek art of that of the Near East. On several of the exterior plates the large heads, probably of deities, in the centre of the exterior panels, have small arms and hands, either each grasping an animal or human in a version of the common Master of Animals motif, or held up empty at the side of the head in a way suggesting inspiration from this motif.

=== Celtic mythology ===
Apart from Cernunnos and Taranis, discussed above, there is no consensus regarding the other figures, and many scholars reject attempts to tie them in to figures known from much later and geographically distant sources. Some Celticists have explained the elephants depicted on plate B as a reference to Hannibal's crossing of the Alps.

Because of the double-headed wolfish monster attacking the two small figures of fallen men on plate b, parallels can be drawn to the Welsh character Manawydan or the Irish Manannán, a god of the sea and the Otherworld. Another possibility is the Gaulish version of Apollo, who was not only a warrior, but one associated with springs and healing besides.

Olmsted relates the scenes of the cauldron to those of the Táin Bó Cuailnge, where the antlered figure is Cú Chulainn, the bull of the base plate is Donn Cuailnge, and the female and two males of plate e are Medb, Ailill, and Fergus. Olmsted also toys with the idea that the female figure flanked by two birds on plate f could be Medb with her pets or Morrígan, the Irish war goddess who often changes into a carrion bird. Olmsted sees Cernunnos as Gaulish version of Irish Cu Chulainn. As Olmsted indicates, the scene on the upper right of plate A, a lion, a boy on a dolphin, and a bull, can be interpreted after the origin of the bulls of the Irish Táin, who take on various matched animal forms, fighting each other in each form, as indicated in the two lions fighting on the lower right of plate A.

Plate B could be interpreted after a Gaulish version of the beginning of the Irish Táin, where Medb sets out to get the Donn bull after making a circuit around her army in her chariot to bring luck to the Táin. Olmsted interprets the scene on plate C as a Gaulish version of the Irish Táin incidents where Cu Chulainn kicks in the Morrigan's ribs when she comes at him as an eel and then confronts Fergus with his broken chariot wheel.

Olmsted (1979) interprets the scene with warriors on the lower part of Plate E as a Gaulish version of the "Aided Fraich" episode of the Táin where Fraich and his men leap over the fallen tree, and then Fraech wrestles with his father Cu Chulainn and is drowned by him, while his magic horn blowers play "the music of sleeping" against Cu Chulainn. In the "Aided Fraich" episode, Fraich's body is then taken into the underworld by weeping banchuire to be healed by his aunt and wife Morrigan. This incident is depicted on outer plate f, which is adjacent and opposite to plate E.

Both Olmsted and Taylor agree that the female of plate f might be Rhiannon of the Mabinogion. Rhiannon is famous for her birds, whose songs could "awaken the dead and lull the living to sleep". In this role, Rhiannon could be considered the Goddess of the Otherworld.

Taylor presents a more pancultural view of the cauldron's images; he concludes that the deities and scenes portrayed on the cauldron are not specific to one culture, but many. He compares Rhiannon, whom he thinks is the figure of plate f, with Hariti, an ogress of Bactrian mythology. In addition, he points to the similarity between the female figure of plate B and the Hindu goddess Lakshmi, whose depictions are often accompanied by elephants. Wheel gods are also cross-cultural with deities like Gaulish Taranis and Hindu Vishnu.

== See also ==
- Ancient Celtic religion
- Migration Period
- Pashupati seal
- Lyon cup
- Gutasaga

== Sources ==
- Green, M. (1996). Celtic Art: Reading the messages. The Everyman Art Library. ISBN 0297833650.
- Hachmann, Rolf (1990). "Gundestrup-Studien. Untersuchungen zu den spätkeltischen Grundlagen der frühgermanischen Kunst" [Gundestrup-Studies. Investigations into the late Celtic foundations of early Germanic art]. Report of the Romano-Germanic Commission [Bericht der römisch-germanischen Kommission] (in German). 71, part 2: 565–903.
- Koch, J., ed. (2006a). "Gundestrup cauldron". Celtic Culture: A historical encyclopedia. ABC-CLIO. p. 854. ISBN 9781851094400 – via google books.
- Laing, Lloyd & Laing, Jennifer (1992). Art of the Celts: From 700 BC to the Celtic revival. World of Art. Thames & Hudson. ISBN 0500202567.
- Megaw, Vincent & Megaw, Ruth (1989). Celtic Art. Thames & Hudson. ISBN 0500050503.
- Olmsted, Garrett S. (1994). The Gods of the Celts and the Indo-Europeans. Inndbrucker Beitrage zur Kulterwissenschaft. Vol. 92. ISBN 9789073835016. — Olmsted, Garrett (2019). "Available online". The Gods of the Celts and the Indo-Europeans (revised ed.) – via academia.edu.
- Olmsted, Garrett (2001). Celtic Art in Transition during the First Century BC. Archaeolingua. Vol. 12. ISBN 9638046376.
- Sandars, Nancy K. (1968). Prehistoric Art in Europe. Pelican History of Art (now Yale History of Art) (1st ed.). Penguin Books.
