= Corno =

- Corno, italian for Natural horn
- Irene Camber-Corno, Italian fencer
- Corno (artist), Canadian artist
- Cornicello, Italian amulet
- Corno, small river of the northern Lazio and eastern Umbria in Italy
- Corno di Rosazzo, municipality in the Province of Udine in the Italian region Friuli-Venezia Giulia
- Corno Giovine, municipality in the Province of Lodi in the Italian region Lombardy

== See also ==
- Corn (disambiguation)
- Corna (disambiguation)
- Corne (disambiguation)
- Corni (disambiguation)
