= Cernunnos =

Celtic horned god

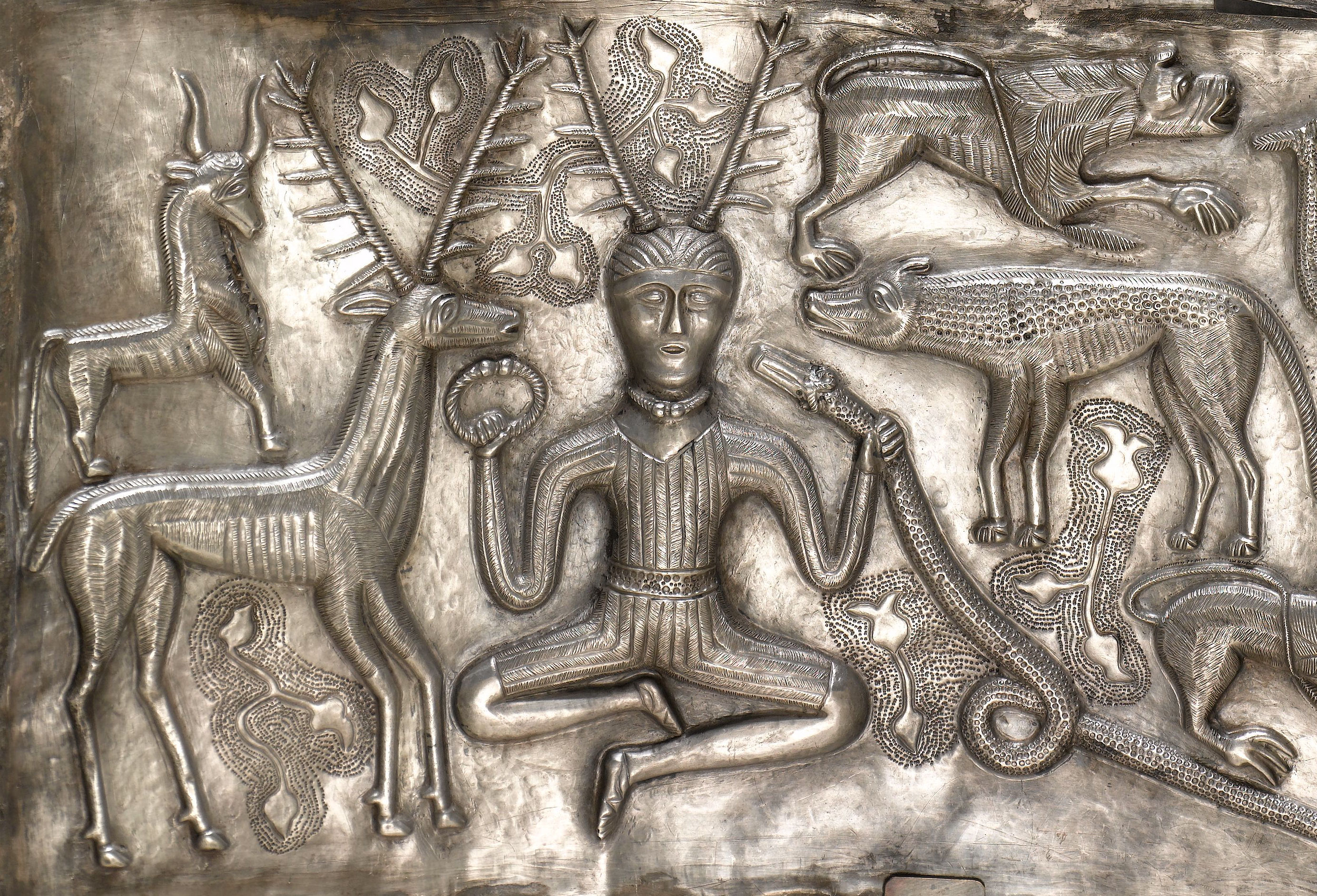
A Cernunnos-type figure on the Gundestrup cauldron (plate A). He sits cross-legged, wielding a torc in one hand and a ram-horned serpent in the other.

Cernunnos is a Celtic god whose name is only clearly attested once, on the 1st-century CE Pillar of the Boatmen from Paris, where it is identified with an image of an aged, antlered figure with torcs around his horns.

Through this artefact, the name "Cernunnos" has been applied to the members of an iconographic cluster, consisting of depictions of an antlered god (often aged and with crossed legs) associated with torcs, ram-horned (or ram-headed) serpents, symbols of fertility, and wild beasts (especially deer). The use of the name this way is common, though not uncontroversial. As many as 25 depictions of the Cernunnos-type have been identified. Though this iconographic group is best attested in north-eastern Gaul, depictions of the god have been identified as far off as Italy (Val Camonica) and Denmark (Gundestrup).

Cernunnos has been variously interpreted as a god of fertility, of the underworld, and of bi-directionality. His cult, attested iconographically as early as the 4th century BCE, seems to have been largely unaffected by the Roman conquest of Gaul, during which he remained unassimilated to the Roman pantheon. Cernunnos has been tentatively linked with Conall Cernach, a hero of medieval Irish mythology, and some later depictions of cross-legged and horned figures in medieval art.

== Name ==
=== Pillar of the Boatmen ===
Cernunnos on the Pillar of the Boatmen

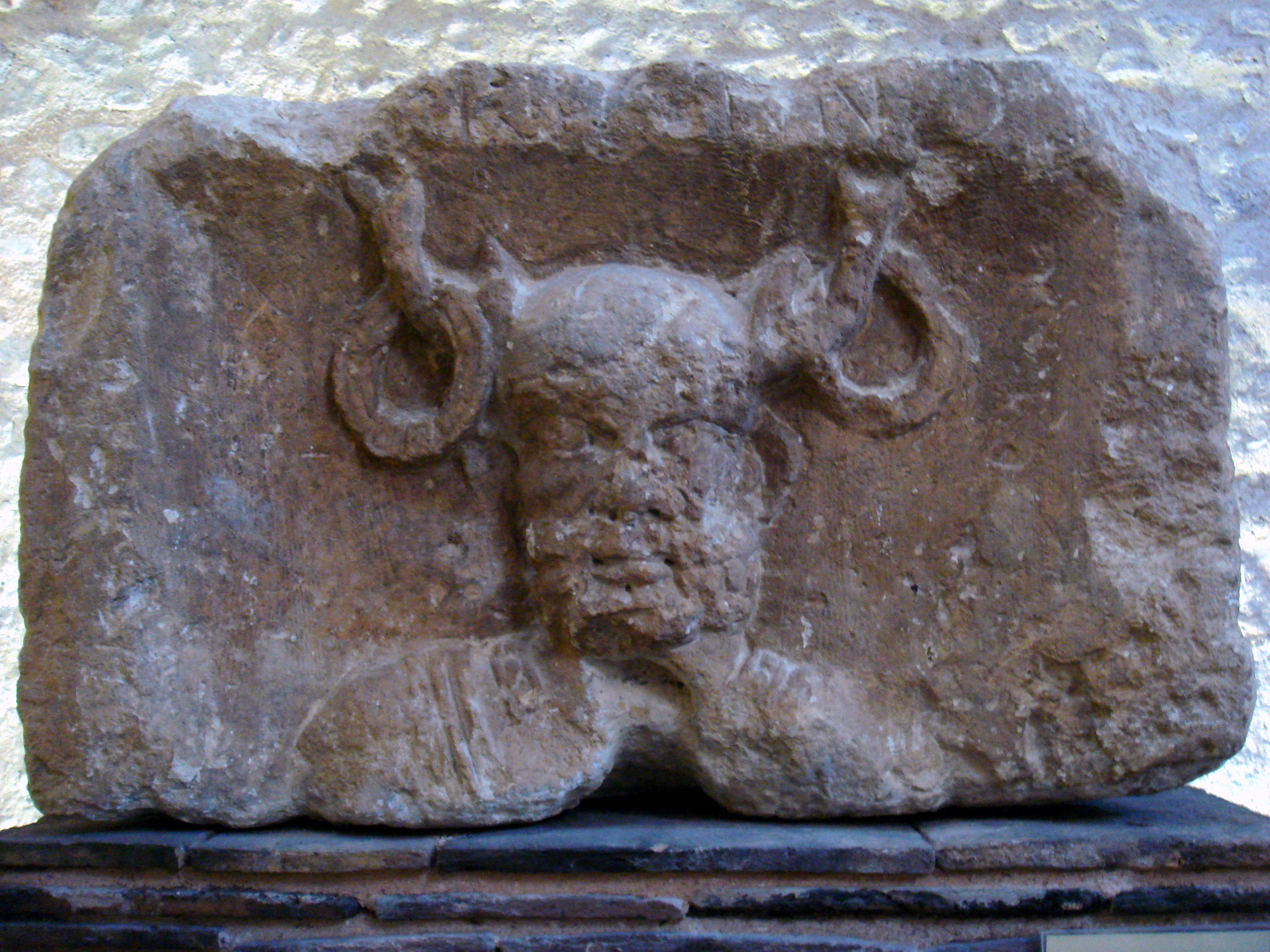
Its present state

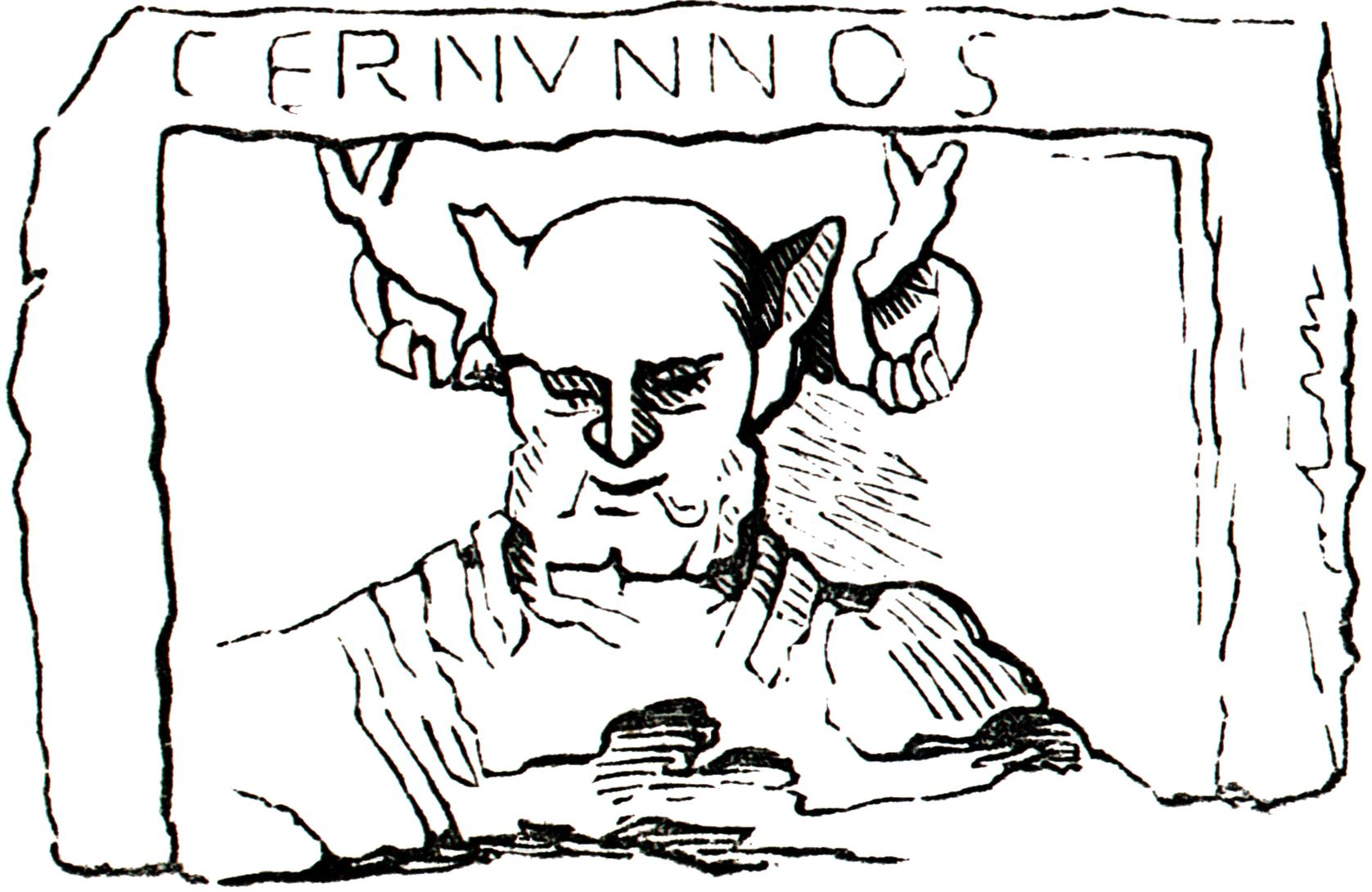
18th century drawing

The Gallo-Roman Pillar of the Boatmen was discovered in 1711 under the choir of Notre-Dame de Paris. It is a religious monument, with depictions of Roman gods (Jupiter, Vulcan, and Castor and Pollux) alongside native Gaulish deities, such as Esus and Smertrios, dedicated by a corporation of boatmen from the city of Lutetia (Roman Paris). The dedication dates it to the reign of Tiberius (14-37 CE). Legends below the images identify the Roman and Gaulish deities by name. In fact, this is the only monument on which Celtic deities are identified by name with captions.

On one block from the pillar, a frowning, bearded figure is depicted from the shoulders up. His face is human, but his upper head is animal-like: hairless and bulging. Atop his head is a pair of bifid deer's antlers, with a torc hanging from each one, and between the antlers are two triangular extrusions (perhaps ears or bull's horns). The lower half of the block is lost; given its original height, the figure could not have been standing, so the panel is believed to have originally shown him cross-legged.

Above the antlered figure is a one-word legend. When information about the pillar was published in 1711, this legend was reported as "Cernunnos". However, the block is now badly damaged. Many of the letters are only partially visible; the letter "C" is entirely gone. Joshua Whatmough has gone as far as to say that in its present state "only 'nn' is certain". The reading from 1711 has sometimes been mistrusted. Joseph Vendryes and Whatmough argue (following the Dacia inscription) that it read "Cernennos". Françoise Le Roux was skeptical about the existence of the final "s".

=== Other possible attestations ===
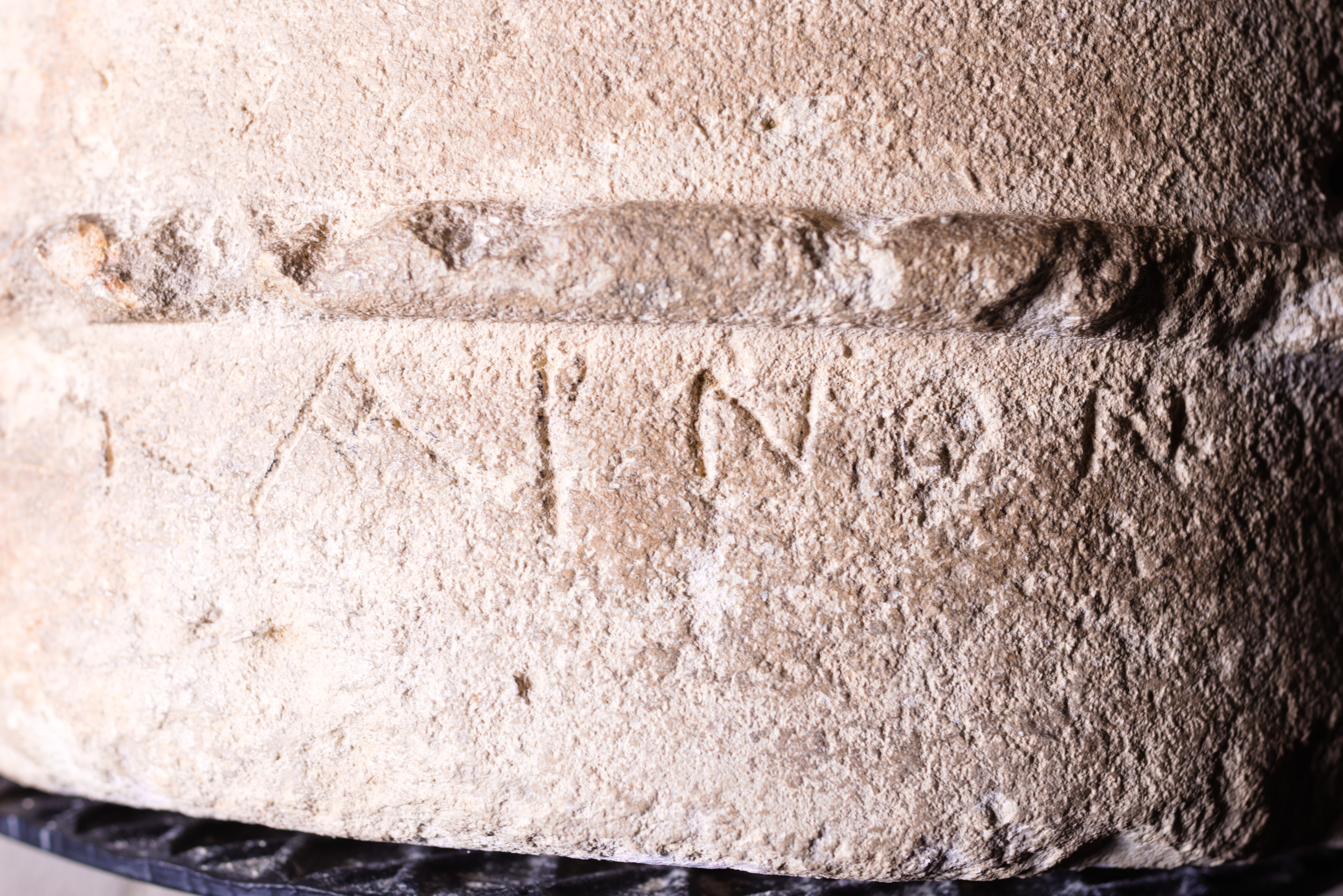
A capital with Gaulish καρνονου or καρνομου

A capital found in Aumes, France (Note: RIG I G-224) is inscribed with a short Gaulish text in Greek letters. Michel Lejeune has interpreted this inscription as a dedication to a god καρνονου (translit. karnonou; in English, "Carnonos"), whom he tentatively connects with the god Cernunnos. However, both Lejeune's reading and his interpretation of this inscription have been contested. Whatmough and D. Ellis Evans prefer the reading καρνομου (translit. karnomou); and Emmanuel Dupraz has argued that the inscription states that an object καρνον (translit. karnon) is being offered, rather than giving the name of a god.

A wax tablet from Dacia (Note: CIL III, p 0924,01) records a decree of 167 CE dissolving one collegi(i) Iovi Cerneni ("collegium of Jupiter Cernenus"), a funerary association. David Fickett-Wilbar identifies this as a reference to Cernunnos, though he comments that it "tells us nothing about the deity other than his name". Theodor Mommsen suggested the byname Cerneni derived from the name of nearby Korna, a hypothesis that has been followed by Michael Altjohann. Le Roux is also sceptical that it is a reference to Cernunnos, as she thinks the interpretatio of Cernunnos as the Roman god Jupiter is unlikely.

A bronze tabula ansata from Steinsel, Luxembourg, (Note: AE 1987, 772) dating between the late 2nd and early 3rd century CE, is dedicated to one Deo Ceruninco ("god Cerunincus"). Though close in name to Cernunnos, the editors of L'Année épigraphique argue that the form of the name entails that it must be another (probably Treverian) god.

=== Etymology ===
The earliest etymology proposed for "Cernunnos" was put forward by Alfred Holder. He held that Cernunnos's name derived from a Celtic reflex of proto-Indo-European *ḱerh₂- ("horn, hoof"). This etymology has the advantage of a close link with Cernunnos's iconography. However, Ernst Windisch and Leo Weisgerber pointed out that ablaut form of the proto-Indo-European root in Celtic is *karno (Note: The presence of this ablaut form in proto-Celtic is attested by two Gaulish words for trumpets (karnon and karnyx), Middle Welsh carn ("hoof"), Old Breton carn ("horse's hoof)", and perhaps Old Irish cruë ("hoof"). Semantically similar words with an o vowel (such as two Insular words both meaning horn, Old Irish corn and Welsh corn) are probably loanwords from Latin (cornu for "horn"), but Gaulish toponyms showing the form might hint at the presence of the reflex *korno ("horn") in proto-Celtic.) rather than *kerno.

Weisgerber proposed that the theonym derived from proto-Celtic *kerno ("angle, excrescence"), (Note: Attested by Old Irish cern ("angle, corner"), Middle Welsh cern ("corner, jaw, cheek, side"), Middle Breton quern ("top"), Cornish Kernow ("Cornwall").) a reflex of the same proto-Indo-European root. Le Roux concurred with Weisgerber; she associated proto-Celtic *kerno with the meaning "top of the head", and argued that Cernunnos's name should be interpreted as "the one who has the top of his head like a deer". Vendryes suggested that the name was cognate with the Old Irish word cern ("hero").

== Iconography ==
A large number of images of an antlered figure, similar to that depicted on the Pillar of the Boatmen, have been found. These depict a male figure, often aged, with crossed legs, with antlers atop his head, who is associated with ram-horned (or ram-headed) serpents, torcs, symbols of fertility, and wild beasts (especially deer). It is conventional to apply to the name of "Cernunnos" to images which fit within this cluster of attributes. At least twenty-five images have been connected with Cernunnos in this way. (Note: The Lexicon Iconographicum Mythologiae Classicae lists 25 images of Cernunnos. Bober discusses over fifty images in relation to the Cernunnos, though she does not identify all these images as of Cernunnos.) Some, such as William Sayers and T. G. E. Powell, have questioned whether the name given on the Pillar (which is so rare in epigraphy) is appropriate to apply to these images. Pierre Lambrechts and Michael Altjohann have even argued that no such well-defined cluster of attributes exists in the archaeological record. (Note: In his Contributions à l'étude des divinités celtiques (1942), Lambrechts examined anthropomorphic representations of Celtic gods (in the process, examining three types associated with Cernunnos: the images of cross-legged divinities, tricephalic divinities, and divinities associated with ram serpents) and argued that all were merely regional representations of a single, poorly defined and multifunctional, supreme god of the Celts: Esus-Teutates. More recently, Altjohann has argued that the attributes of the Cernunnos type are freely correlated with other non-Cernunnos types, and that therefore no clearly defined god called Cernunnos can be identified within Roman Gaul.)

=== Distribution and history ===
The majority of the images identified as of Cernunnos have been found in Gaul, clustered around Paris and Reims. A rock drawing in Valcamonica (Lombardy, Italy) and the figure on Plate A of the Gundestrup cauldron (found in Himmerland, Denmark) are conspicuous geographic exceptions. Engraved onto a rock at the prehistoric site of Val Camonica is a tall figure with antlers atop his head, arms in orans position, and a torc around his right arm. Besides him, on his right, are a ram-horned serpent and a smaller man (ithyphallic, arms in orans position). The detailed scene on Plate A of the Gundestrup cauldron has Cernunnos cross-legged, wielding a torc in one hand and a ram-horned serpent in the other. Around him are many animals: two bulls, a stag, a dolphin with a rider, griffins, and a hyena. The provenance and date of the Gundestrup cauldron have been the subject of much debate. Cernunnos has been tentatively connected with images over a large geographical range, including Britain, Spain, Austria, Slovenia, and Romania.

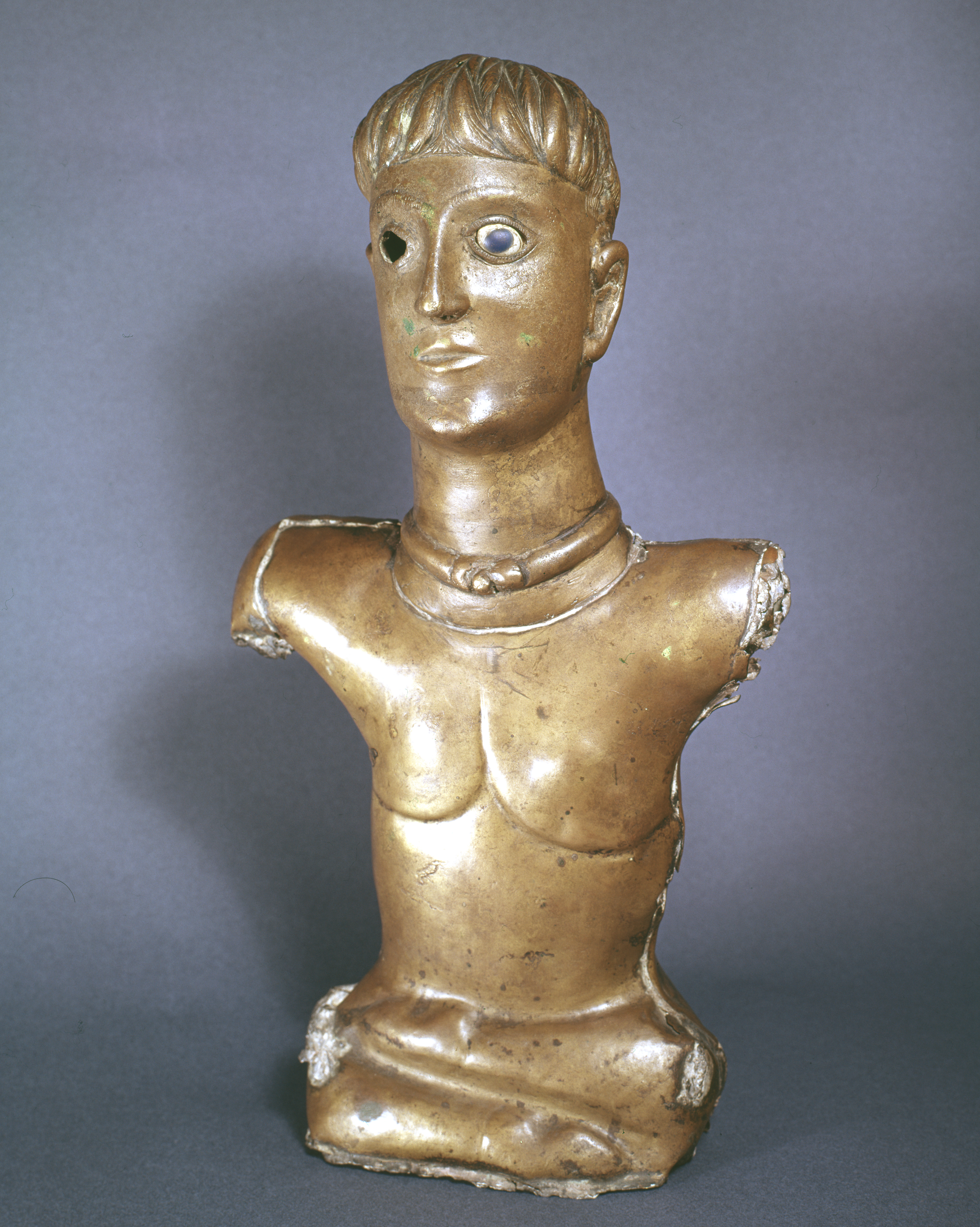
The God of Bouray: a rare pre-Roman depiction of a Gaulish god. Cross-legged and hooved, the relationship of this Gaulish god to Cernunnos is uncertain.

The earliest datable representations of Cernunnos in Gaul date, like the Pillar of the Boatmen, to the reign of Tiberius (i.e., 14-37 CE); the latest to the 3rd century CE. The archaeological evidence for images of deities in Gaul is scant before the Roman conquest. The God of Bouray, a bronze statuette probably produced not long before the Roman conquest, depicts a Gaulish god with crossed legs and hooves. The relationship of this god with Cernunnos is uncertain.

Outside of Gaul, much earlier representations of Cernunnos are known. The drawing from Valcamonica dates to 4th century BCE. José Maria Blázquez has argued that a painted vase, dating to the 2nd century BCE, from the Celtiberian site of Numantia, gives another early representation of Cernunnos. The Gundestrup cauldron, of either Thracian or Celtic work, has been assigned to dates within a large range (from 200 BCE to 300 CE).

After Christianisation, images of Cernunnos were the subject of iconoclastic destruction. A statue of Cernunnos from Verteuil (Charente, France) was beheaded and the horns of Cernunnos on the Reims altar seem to have been purposefully chipped off.

Some scholars (such as Duval and Bober) have suggested that Cernunnos's distinctive iconography persisted into the medieval period. Cernunnos has been seen on Christian monuments from Ireland, such as the north cross at Clonmacnoise, the market cross at Kells, and a stele at Carndonagh. The figure identified as Cernunnos on the 9th-century Clonmacnoise north cross appears to have horns and crossed legs; Fickett-Wilbar argues that these are misidentified ornamental motifs. On the Continent, Cernunnos has been seen in the Stuttgart Psalter and on a capital of Parma Cathedral. A leaf from the c. 820 Stuttgart Psalter depicts the Descent into Limbo, with a devil figure (perhaps Hades) whom Bober identifies as of the Cernunnos-type, "complete with cross-legged posture, antlers, and even a ram-headed serpent", though J. R. M. Galpern identifies the features on the devil's head as wings, and connects them with motifs from Late Antique and Roman funerary art.

=== Attributes and associations ===
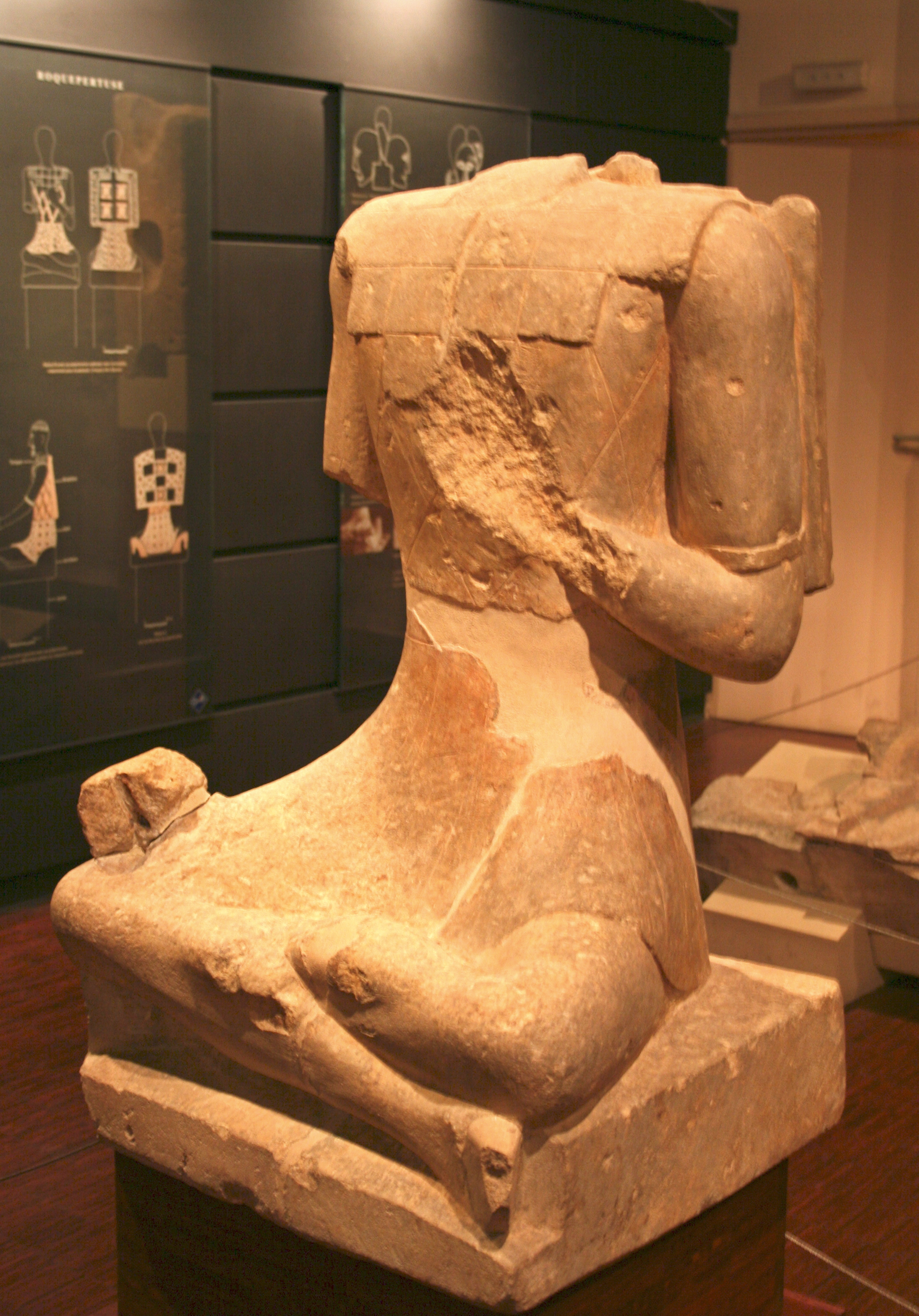
A seated figure from Roquepertuse

The cross-legged pose of Cernunnos has occasioned much comment. Elaborate diffusionist theories have been proposed to explain the origin of this particular motif. A popular theory proposes that the pose represents the transmission of a Buddhist motif (the lotus pose) from India via Greco-Egyptian work. Against a diffusionist hypothesis, Robert Mowat argued that this pose reflected the normal sitting position of the Gauls; he cited the testimony of Strabo and Diodorus that the Gauls sat on the floor for meals. In religious iconography, the position does not seem to have been exclusively associated with Cernunnos. Statues from the pre-Roman Gaulish sanctuary of Roquepertuse assume the same pose; though clearly of religious significance, they are not representations of Cernunnos. Representations of Cernunnos standing are known (such as the early example from Val Camonica).

Cernunnos is often depicted with torcs adorning his body. Most commonly he grasps one, and wears another around his neck. Sometimes he holds another on his chest. The torc is a ubiquitous feature of Celtic art and garb. They seem to have been a symbol of religious significance in Celtic art and, after the Roman conquest, perhaps a symbol of native identity.

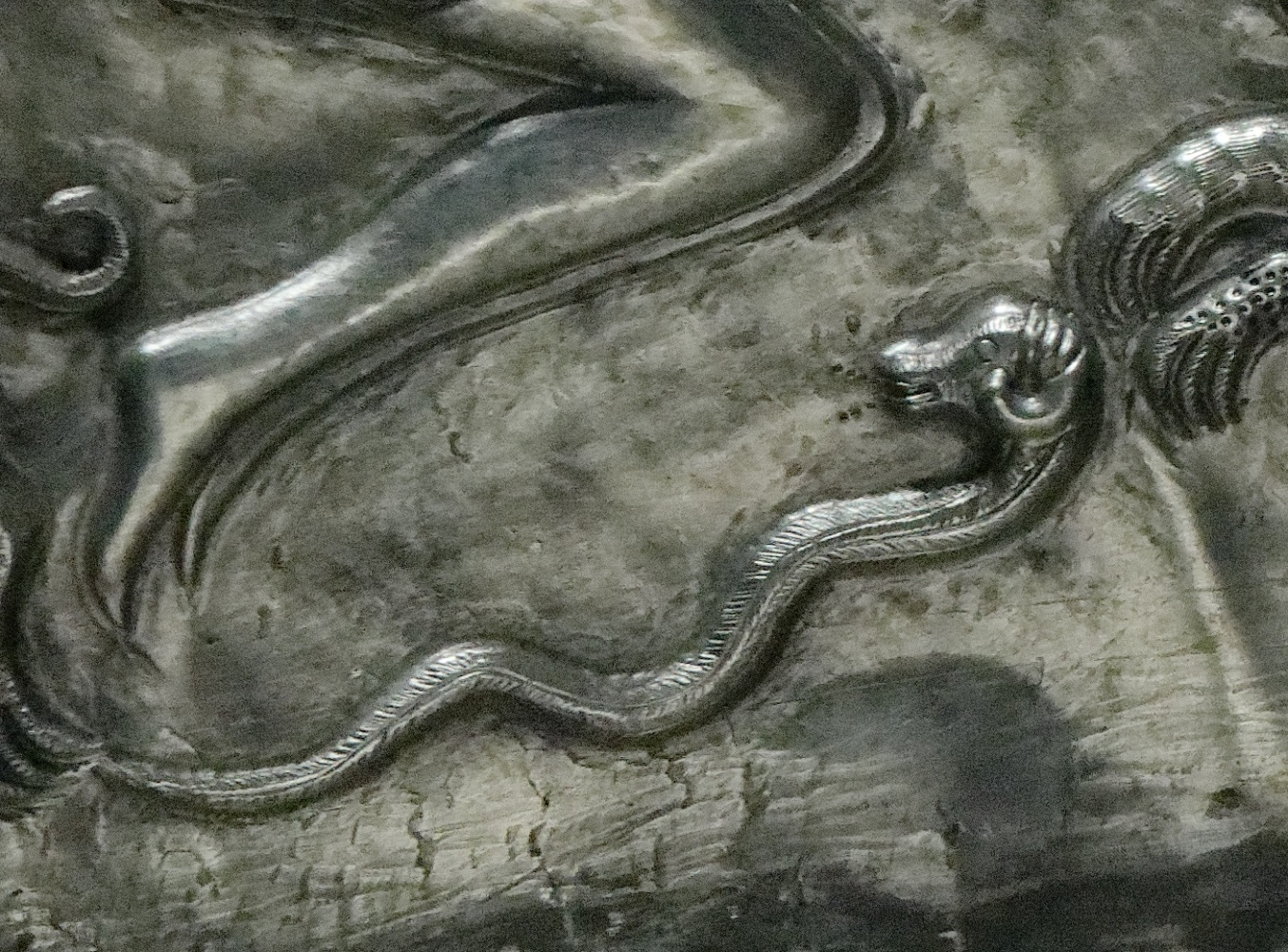
Ram-horned serpent on the Gundestrup cauldron (plate C)

The ram-horned (or ram-headed) serpent is a hybrid beast peculiar to the Celts. The creature, which is associated with Cernunnos early as Val Camonica, appears to have had a significance independent of Cernunnos. In Gaul, ram-horned serpents are depicted alone or accompanying Mars or Mercury. Ram-horned serpents also feature on two other plates of the Gundestrup cauldron (C and E). Cernunnos is also sometimes accompanied by serpents without the attributes of a ram, as on the Vendœuvres relief. The ram-horned serpent has been suggested to have a chthonic significance.

Some scholars, such as Miranda Green, have connected Cernunnos with the Lord of the Animals motif through such depictions as the Gundestrup cauldron, where Cernunnos is placed centrally around a number of animals. The closest parallel to the Gundestrup scene is given on the Lyon cup, where Cernunnos is surrounded by a deer, a hound, and a (hornless) snake.

On various depictions, Cernunnos is associated with other deities. The significance of these associations is unclear. On three depictions, Cernunnos appears with Mercury and Apollo; on the Lyon cup, he is paired with Mercury alone. Cernunnos is also depicted twice with Abundantia, Roman goddess of prosperity, and twice with Hercules. Three images of Cernunnos (among them, the Condat tricephal and Étang-sur-Arroux statuette) give Cernunnos three heads or faces. Bober argued that these images represent the syncretisation of Cernunnos with the (poorly understood) tricephalic god of Gaul.

=== Interpretation ===
Because of his persistent association with the natural world (for example, on the Gundestrup cauldron, where he is surrounded by various beasts), some scholars describe Cernunnos as the lord of animals or wild things. Miranda Green describes him as a "peaceful god of nature and fruitfulness".

Cernunnos is also associated with fertility and fecundity. Blazquez points out that the stag is a symbol of fertility across the Mediterranean. The association of Cernunnos with fertility is emphasised by other attributes. He is variously provided with a basket of fruit (as on the Étang-sur-Arroux statuette), a cornucopia (as on the Lyon cup), and a bag of coins (as on the Reims altar).

It has been suggested that Cernunnos carried a chthonic significance. Bober's study of the god concluded that Cernunnos was god of the underworld. She analyses the ram-horned serpent as the synthesis of two animals (the snake and the ram) of chthonic significance to the Celts. The rat above Cernunnos on the Reims altar and the association of Cernunnos with Mercury (guide of souls to the underworld) on several representations have also been thought to suggest an association with the underworld.

Fickett-Wilbar, in a recent study, has proposed that Cernunnos was a god of bi-directionality and mediator between opposites.

=== Gallery ===
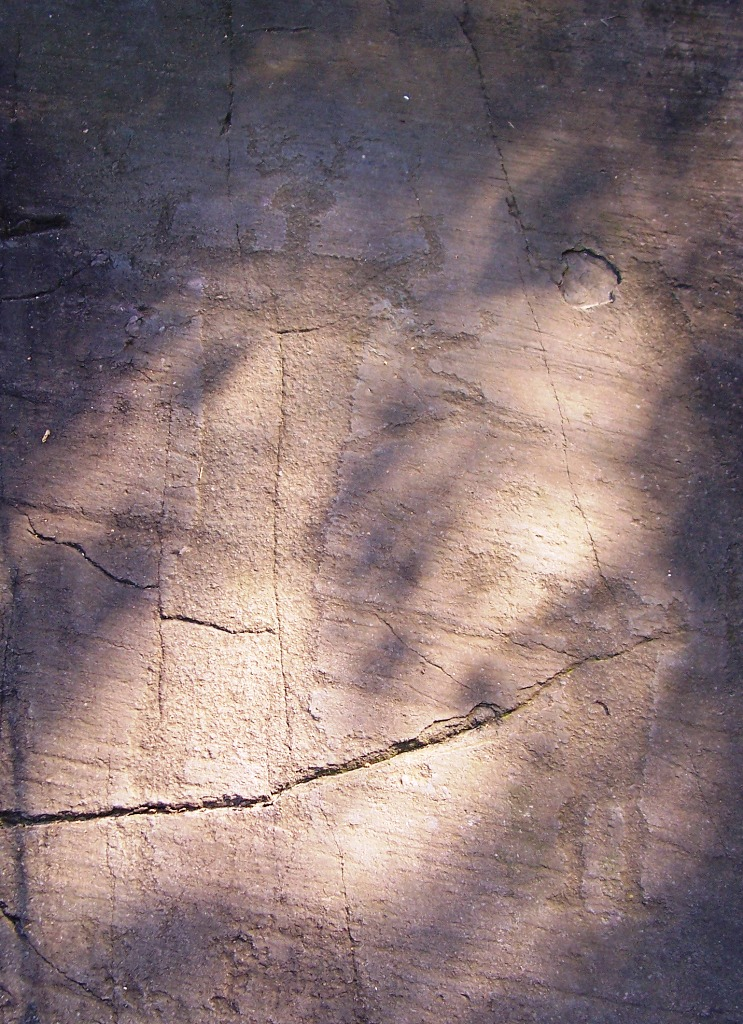
Rock carving of an antlered figure from Val Camonica, Italy.

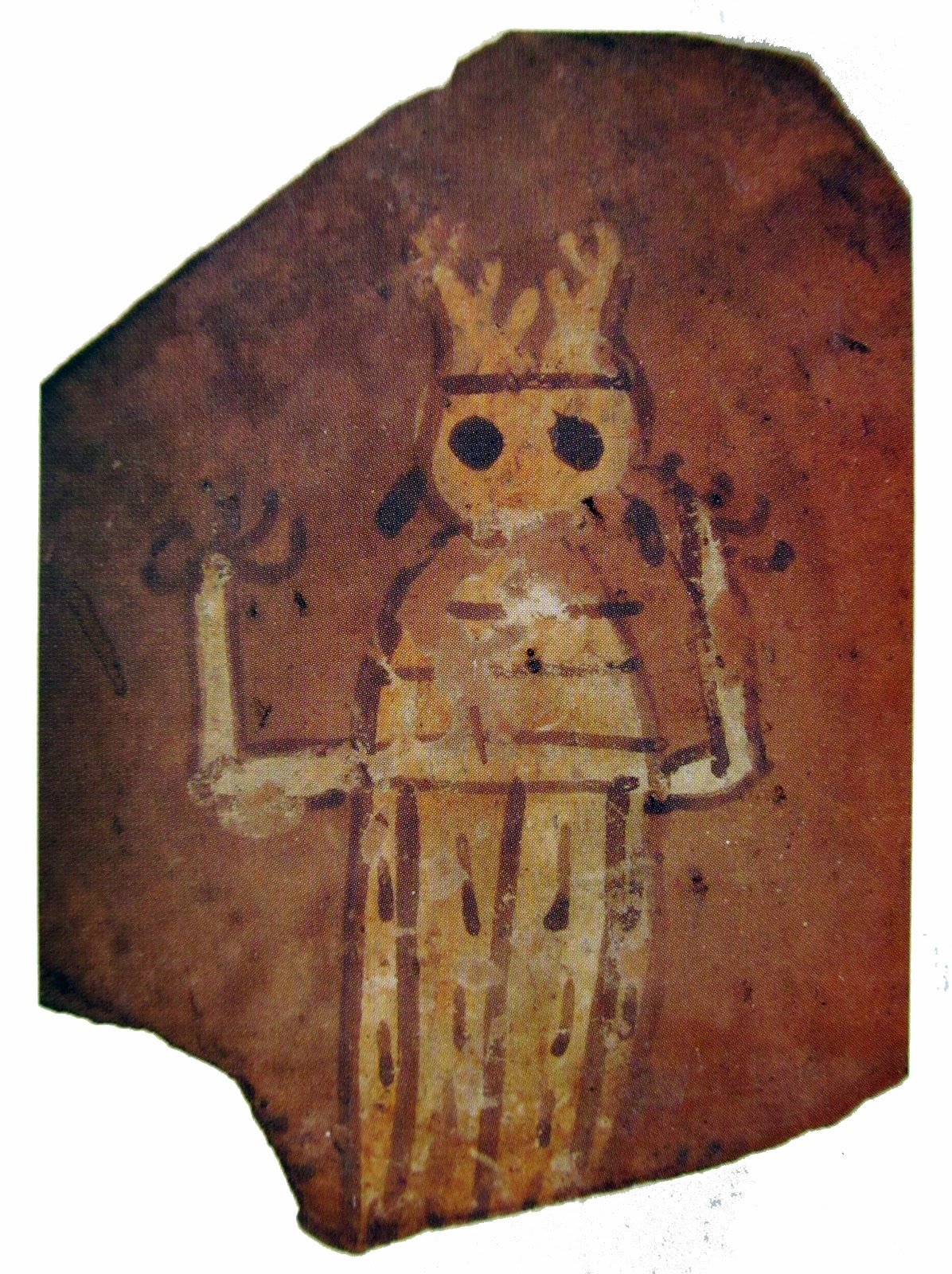
Fragment of a painted vase from Numantia, Spain. Blázquez has identified the antlered figure as Cernunnos, comparing him with the image from Valcamonica.

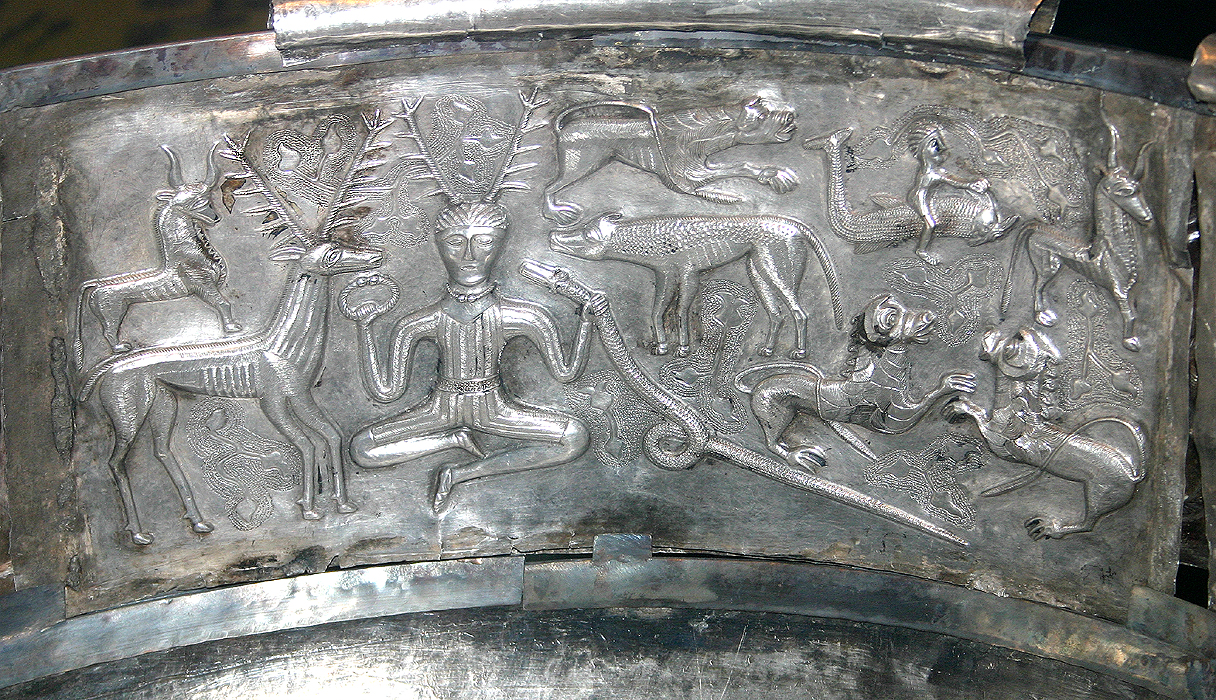
The full scene from Plate A of the Gundestrup Cauldron.

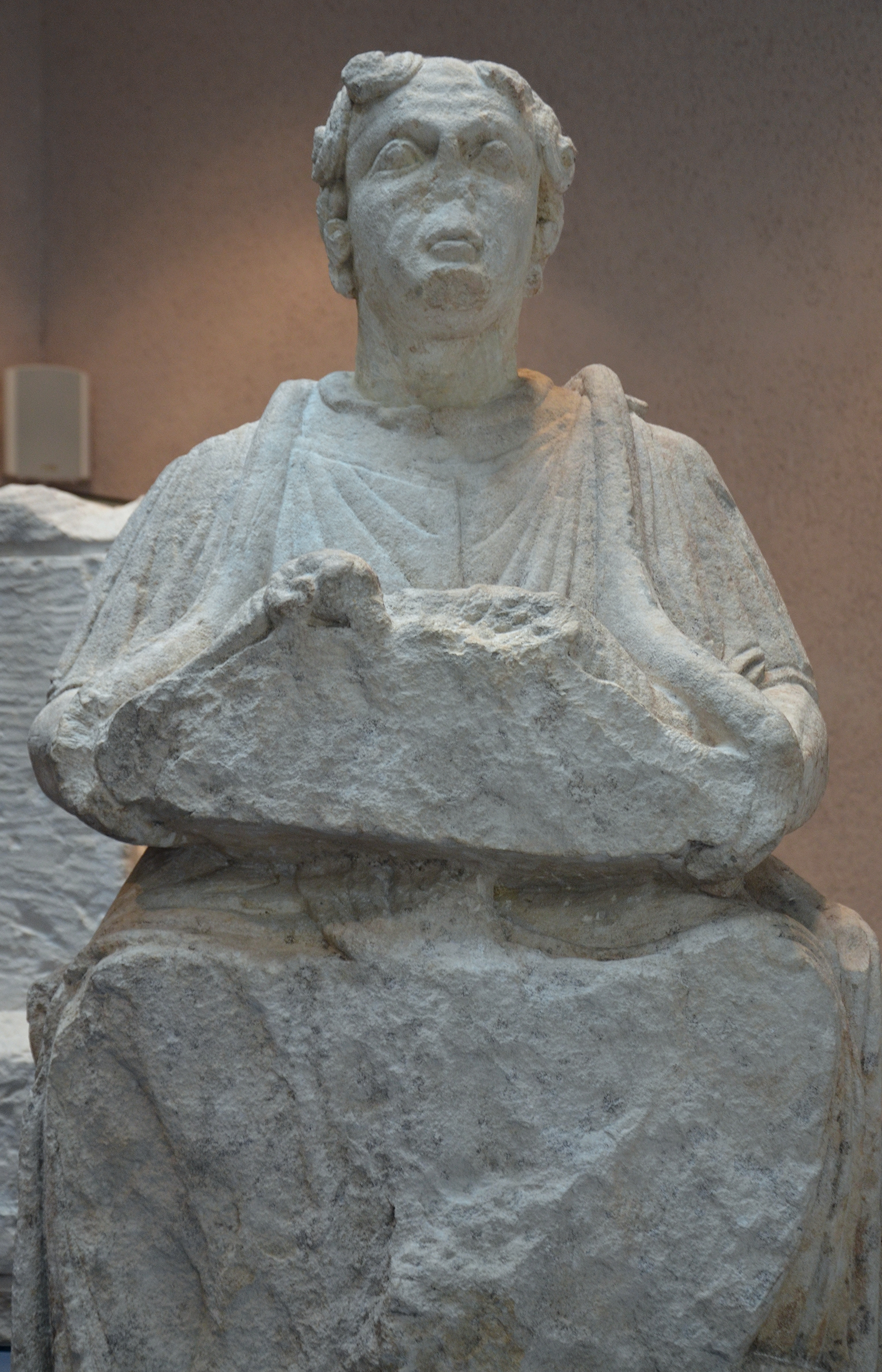
Statue of Cernunnos from Sommerécourt, Haute-Marne. His horns have been broken off. Two horned snakes feed from a bowl in the figure's hands.

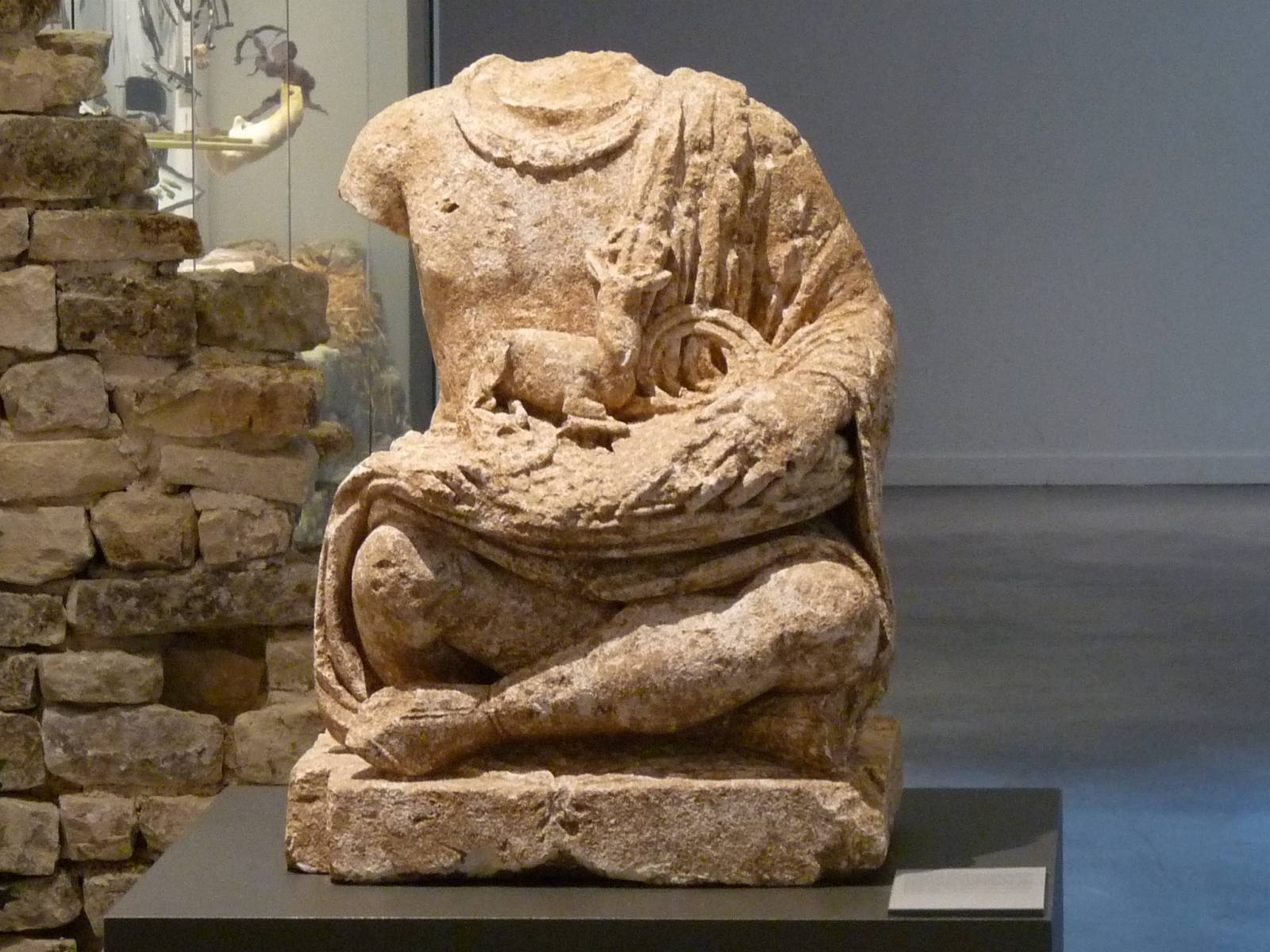
Statue of Cernunnos from Verteuil, Charente. The figure holds a small stag, a torc, and a bag of coins; its head has been purposefully removed.

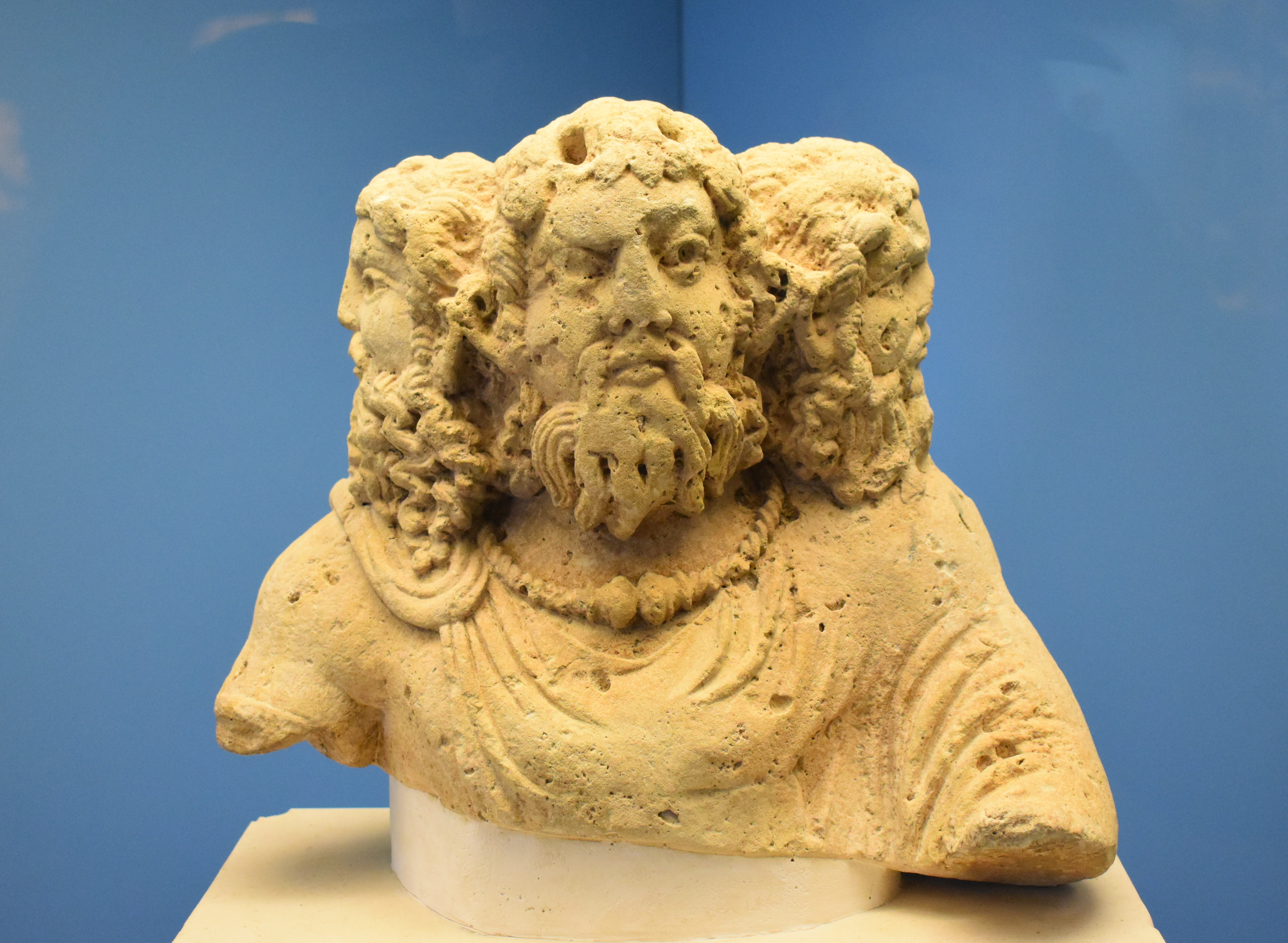
Three-headed bust of Cernunnos from Condat-sur-Trincou, Dordogne. The central head wears a torc and has holes for antlers.

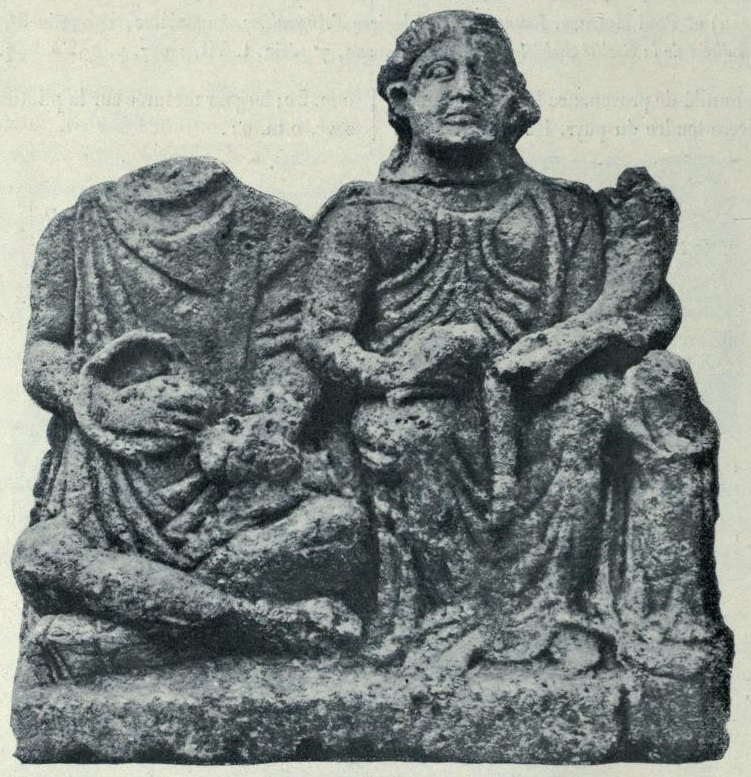
Front of a relief from Saintes, Charente-Maritime. To the left is Cernunnos with purse and torc, to the right is Abundantia with cornucopia.

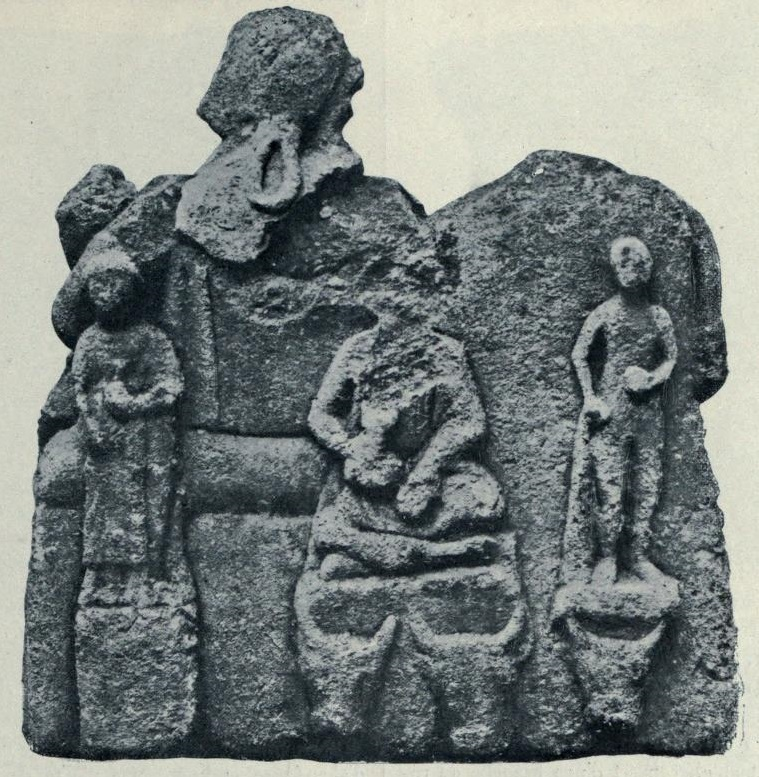
Rear of a relief from Saintes, Charente-Maritime. At the centre is Cernunnos, to the right is Hercules, and to the left is a draped woman.

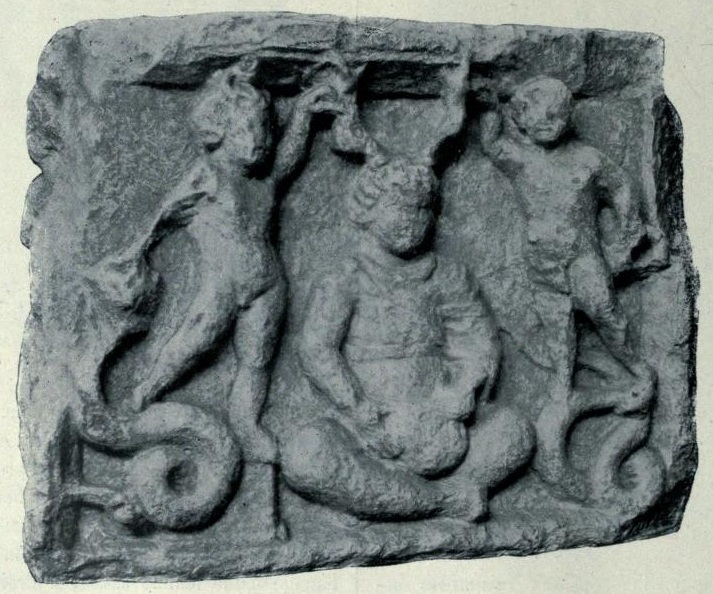
Cernunnos on an altar from Vendœuvres, Indre. Cernunnos, unusually youthful looking, is depicted between two genii atop serpents.

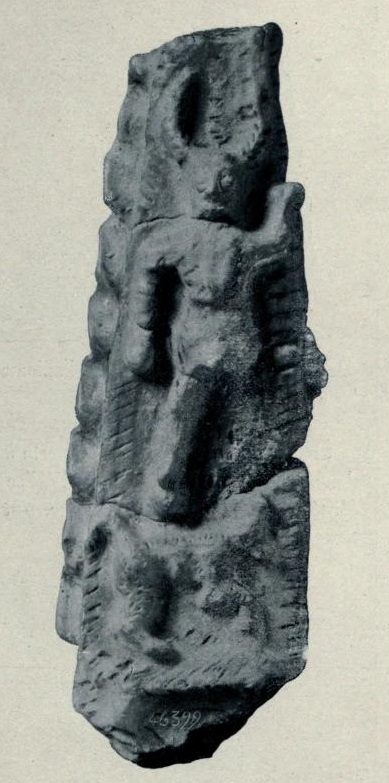
Cernunnos on a fragment of terracotta from Blain, Loire-Atlantique. He is nude and appears to be standing a top an animal, perhaps a wild boar or cow.

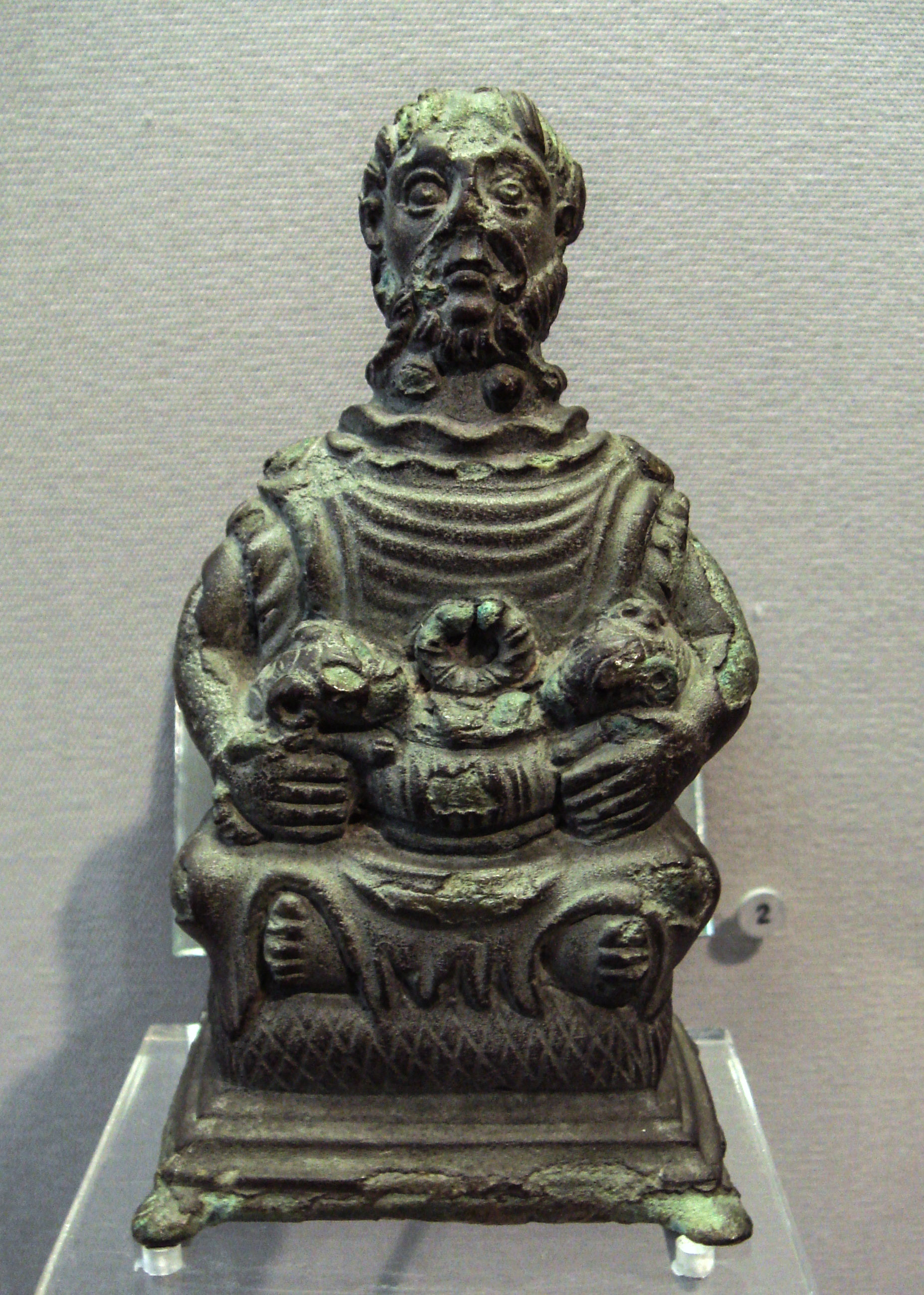
The Étang-sur-Arroux statuette of Cernunnos. He has two torcs and two holes at the top of his head, probably to receive deer antlers. Above his ears are two small faces.

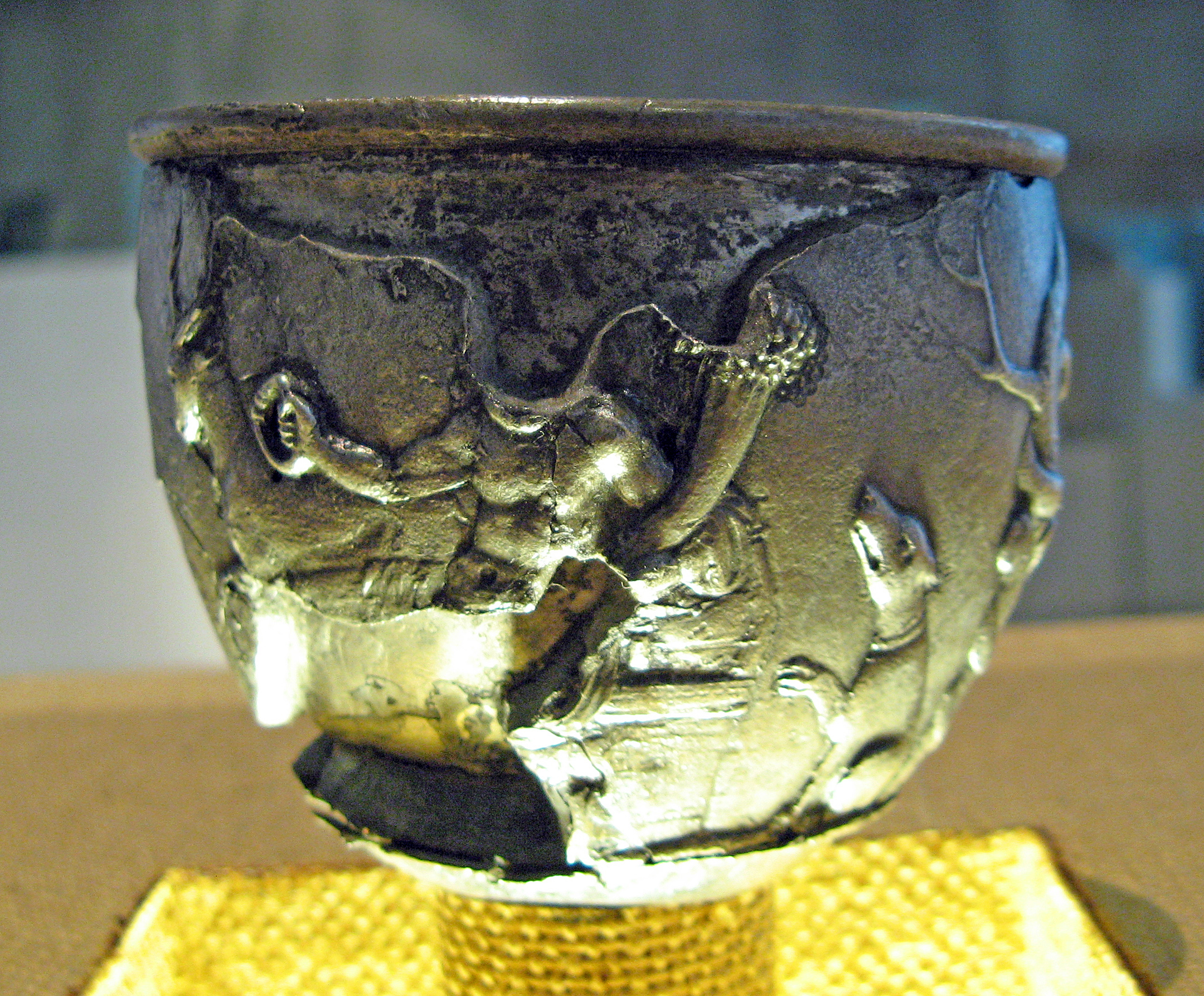
Cernunnos on the Lyon cup. A torc-wearing figure reclines in between a deer and a dog.

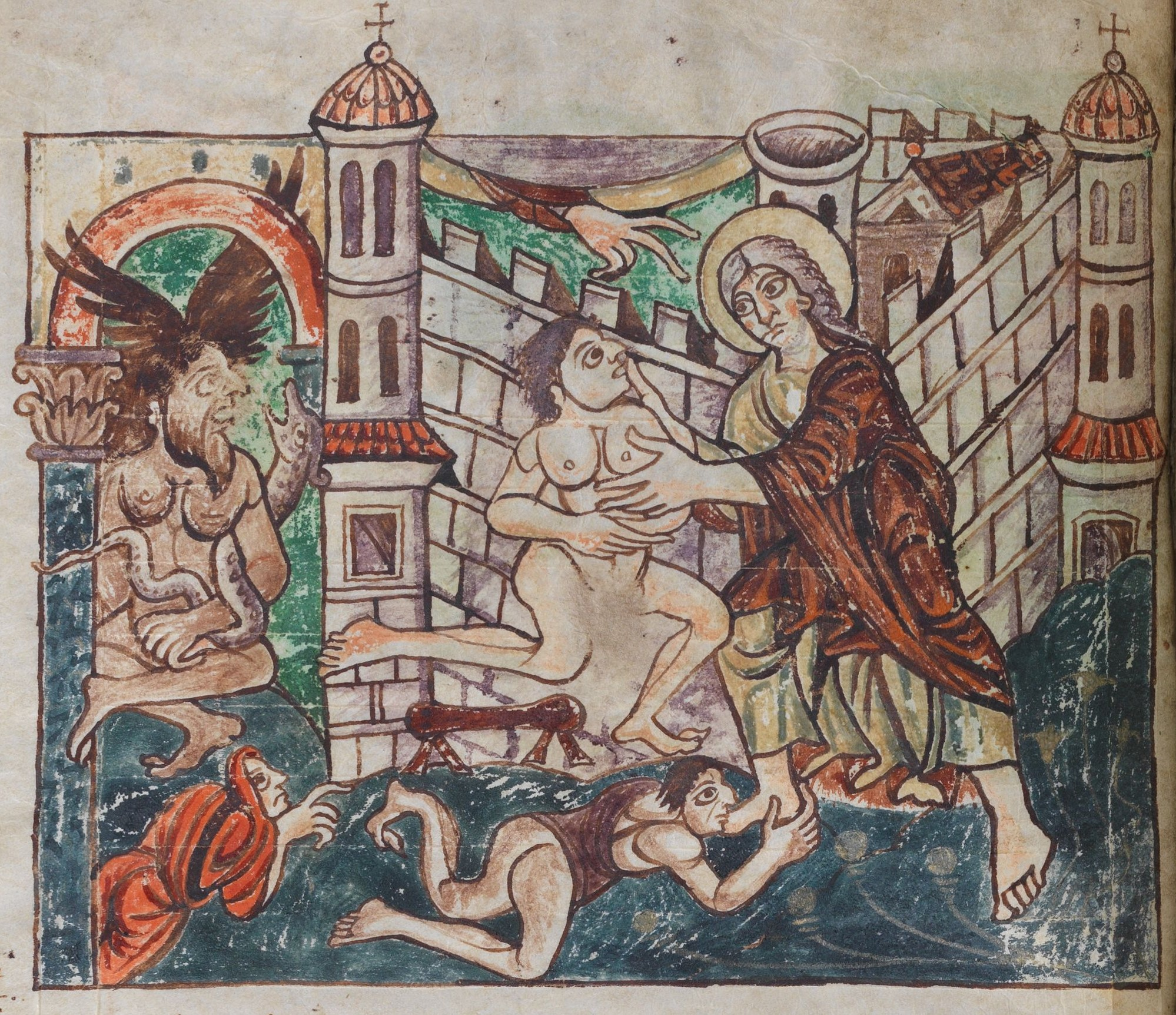
Cross-legged devil figure with a snake, depicted in the Stuttgart Psalter.

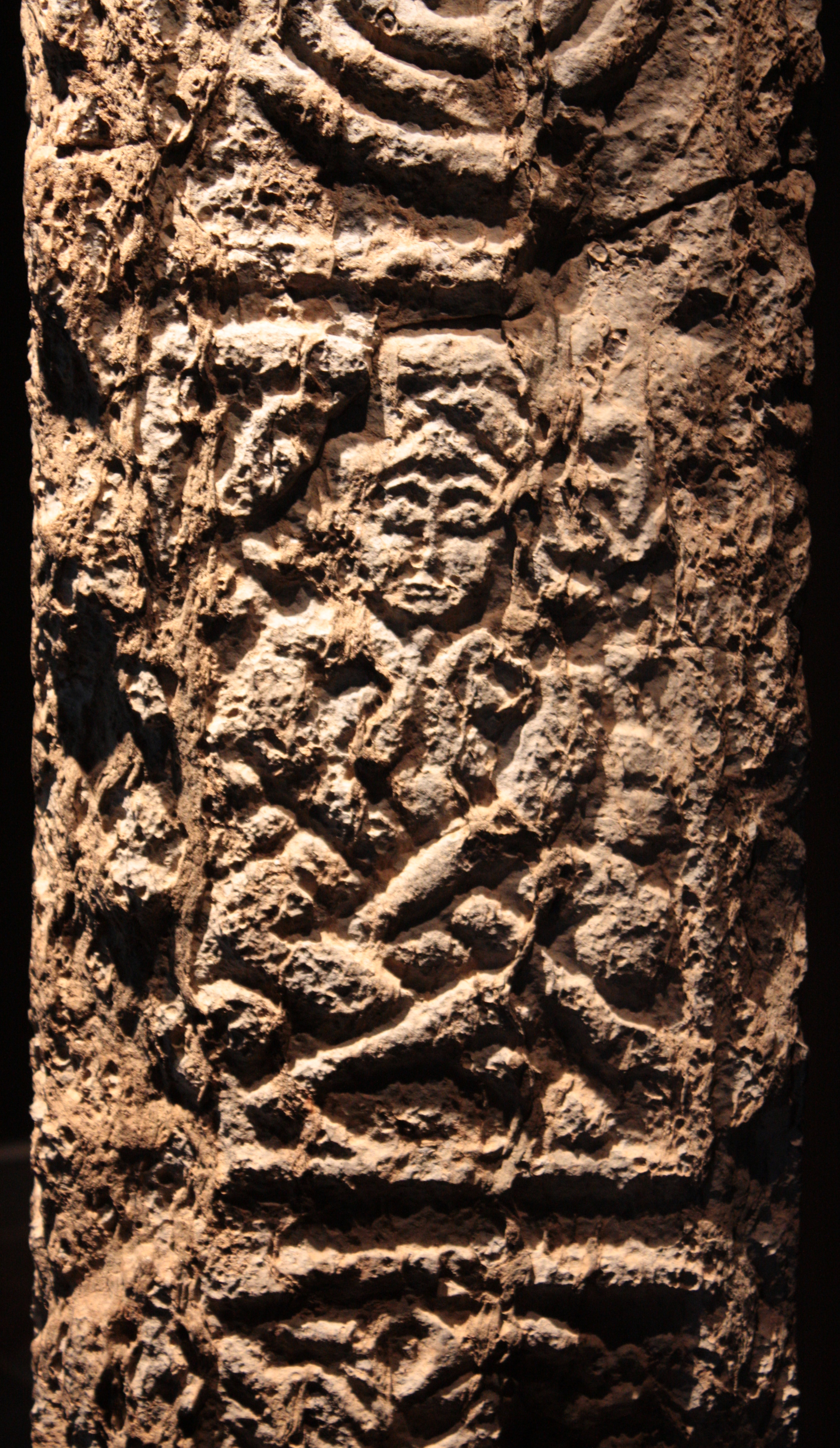
A figure, perhaps cross-legged and horned, on the north cross at Clonmacnoise.

== Cernunnos and interpretatio romana ==
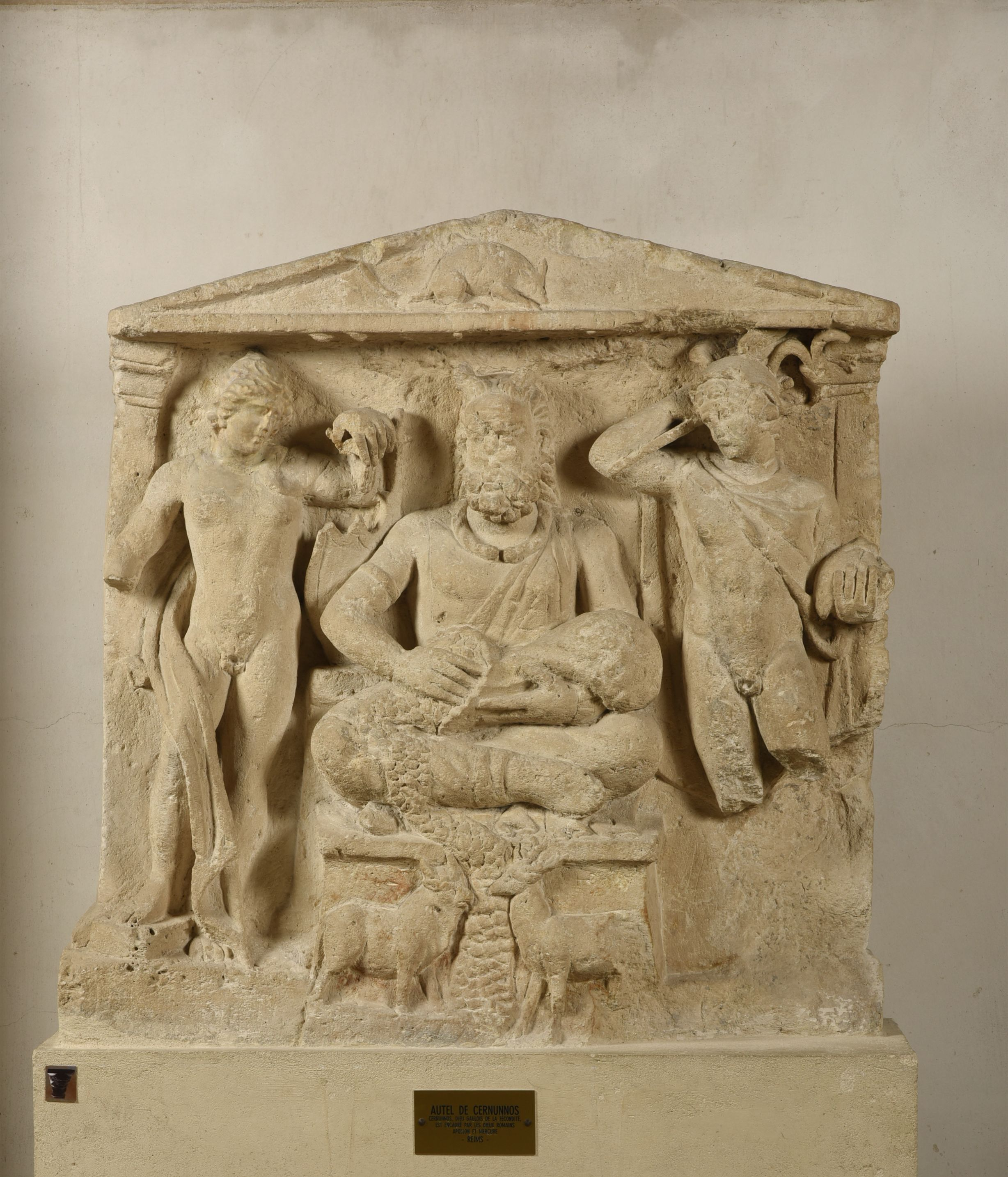
Altar from Reims with Cernunnos in between Apollo and Mercury.

The process of interpretatio romana, by which the Romans identified and syncretised gods of foreign cults with gods of their own pantheon, is one which Cernunnos seems to have been peculiarly resistant to. He has been compared in this respect with Epona and Sucellus, other Gallo-Roman gods with distinctive iconographies, though unlike them his iconography predates the Roman conquest. Cernunnos is not paired with any Greco-Roman god in epigraphy, with the possible exception of the Dacia inscription. The iconography of Cernunnos occasionally borrows from that of Mercury, and the representation of Cernunnos on the Vendœuvres relief seems to have been influenced by depictions of Jupiter Dolichenus. However, even when paired with Roman deities (as on the Reims altar), Cernunnos's iconography is distinctly Celtic. William Van Andringa has suggested that this was because there was no clear Roman equivalent to Cernunnos.

Cernunnos does not appear in any ancient sources under his native name. Some passages from ancient authors referring to Celtic gods under Greek or Roman names (per the usual interpretatio romana or graeca) have been tentatively connected with Cernunnos. Caesar's remark that the Gauls regarded themselves as descendants of a god he likened to Dis Pater (Roman god of the underworld) has occasioned much comment. Though Sucellus is the Gaulish god most commonly identified as behind Dis Pater in this passage, Cernunnos has also been considered as a candidate. Bober has argued that Cernunnos was a "chthonic-fertility" god, like Dis Pater, and therefore that this was a natural identification to make. A story about the Roman general Sertorius (reported by Plutarch, among others) describes Sertorius's attempts to take advantage of local Lusitanian religious feeling by declaring a white doe a gift of Artemis (Greek goddess of the hunt) and pretending he could use it for divination. The Lusitanians were Celts, and it has been suggested by David Rankin that the god behind this Lusitanian Artemis was Cernunnos, though the Lusitanian god Ataegina has also been proposed, and Andreas Hofeneder has emphasised the hypothetical nature of any identification. Rankin has also suggested that Cernunnos and Smertrios lay behind the Greek historian Timaeus's description of a cult of the Dioscuri among the oceanic Celts, though Hofeneder again regards this as unprovable.

== Cernunnos and later mythology ==
=== Conall Cernach ===
Conall is a hero of the Ulster Cycle of Irish mythology. The companion and foster brother of Cúchulainn, he appears in such stories as Táin Bó Cúailnge, and several tales involving Fraích (such as Táin Bó Fraích and Fled Bricrenn). Conall's byname "Cernach" has been linked with Old Irish word cern (with the meanings of "excrescence, angle", "plate", and "victory"). Through this root, there have been attempts to connect Conall with Cernunnos.

A brief passage involving Conall in the Táin Bó Fraích ("The Cattle Raid on Fraích") has been taken by Anne Ross as evidence that Conall bore a connection with Cernunnos. In this episode, Conall assists the protagonist Fraích in rescuing his wife and son, and reclaiming his cattle. The fort that Conall must penetrate is guarded by a mighty serpent. This fearsome serpent, instead of attacking Conall, darts to Conall's waist and girdles him as a belt. Rather than killing the serpent, Conall allows it to live, and then proceeds to attack and rob the fort of its great treasures the serpent previously protected. Ross explains the serpent's anticlimactic behaviour with reference to the images of Cernunnos with ram-horned serpents curled around him (as on the Étang-sur-Arroux statuette).

=== Other mythologies ===
Cernunnos has also been suggested to have survived in other legends. Justin Favrod suggests that a fertility festival (perhaps involving deer costumes), held on the 1 January in some Celtic countries and suppressed by the church after Christianisation, represented a festival to Cernunnos. Gwilherm Berthou equated Cernunnos with the mythical Breton Saint Cornély, protector of cattle. R. Lowe Thompson suggested that Herne the Hunter, an antlered ghost of English folklore first attested in Shakespeare, was cognate with Cernunnos.

== Neopaganism and Wicca ==
Within neopaganism, specifically the Wiccan tradition, the Horned God is a deity that is believed to be the equal to the Great Goddess and syncretizes various horned or antlered gods from various cultures. The name Cernunnos became associated with the Wiccan horned god through the adoption of the writings of Margaret Murray, an Egyptologist and folklorist of the early 20th century. Murray, as expressed through her witch-cult hypothesis, believed that the various horned deities found in Europe were expressions of a "proto-horned god" and in 1931 published her theory in The God of the Witches. Her work was considered highly controversial at the time, but was adopted by Gerald Gardner in his development of the religious movement of Wicca.

Within the Wiccan tradition, the Horned God reflects the seasons of the year in an annual cycle of life, death and rebirth and his imagery is a blend of the Gaulish god Cernunnos, the Greek god Pan, The Green Man motif, and various other horned spirit imagery.

== See also ==
- Abbots Bromley Horn Dance
- God of Amiens
- Horned deity
- Naigamesha
- Wild Hunt
