= Corna (disambiguation) =

Corna usually refers to the sign of the horns, a hand gesture.

Corna may also refer to:

- Corna (Lycaonia), a town and bishopric of ancient Lycaonia, now in Turkey
- Corna (moth), a genus of moths

== People ==
- Antonio della Corna (fl. 15th–16th centuries), artist
- Giovan Giacomo Dalla Corna (c. 1485 – c. 1560), Italian violin maker
- Luisa Corna (born 1965), TV presenter, singer and actress
- Stefania Corna (1990–2026), Italian volleyball player

== See also ==
- Corna Imagna, comune in the Province of Bergamo in the Italian region of Lombardy
- Corna Mara, mountain of Lombardy, Italy
- Corna Trentapassi, mountain of Lombardy, Italy
- Cornas
- Cornea
- Crna (disambiguation)
