= Korn (disambiguation) =

Korn is an American nu metal band.

Korn or KORN may refer to:

- Korn (surname), and persons with the name
- Korn (liquor), a type of distilled alcohol
- Korn (album), by the band Korn
- KORN (AM), a radio station in Mitchell, South Dakota, United States
- KORN-FM, a radio station in Mitchell, South Dakota, United States
- Korn, Buenos Aires, a city in Argentina
- KORN, a fictional radio station from the television series Hee Haw
- Korn, artist in the graffiti crew Smart Crew
- Korn, Japanese reggae rapper and occasional guest judge on Iron Chef

== See also ==
- KornShell, a computer interface

== See also ==
- Corn (disambiguation)
- Corne (disambiguation)
- Korne (disambiguation)
