= Korna =

Korna may refer to:

- Korna (Lycaonia), town of ancient Lycaonia, now in Turkey
- The Korňa village and municipality in Čadca District in the Žilina Region of northern Slovakia
- al-Qurnah, a city in Iraq
