= Iowa Lake (Minnesota) =

Lake in the state of Minnesota, United States

- Location within Minnesota Location within the United States
- Location: Cook County, Minnesota, United States
- Coordinates: 47°47′58″N 90°46′22″W
- Primary outflows: Corny Lake, Poplar River
- Basin countries: United States
- Surface area: 30 acres (0 km^{2})

Iowa Lake is a 30-acre lake in Cook County, Minnesota and tributary to the Poplar River. It has a maximum depth of 13 feet and is clear down to 7 feet. Water access is provided by a portage trail leading to its northeast shore. The lake is fed primarily by a stream on its northwest shore, with secondary intake coming from a pond of less than 100 feet to the north and an intermittent stream located to the south of the portage trail. Its outlet, on the south, empties into Corny Lake through a wetland area. A 1972 survey by Minnesota's DNR indicated the presence of a beaver lodge on the south outlet, and multiple beaver dams along the course of the creek have converted patches of the marsh into open water. A 1971 survey by the fisheries department indicated the lake was home to populations of northern pike, white sucker, and yellow perch.
