= Korne =

Korne may refer to:

- Korne, Chojnice County, a settlement in Chojnice County, Poland
- Korne, Kościerzyna County, a village in Kościerzyna County, Poland
- Radu Korne, Romanian Brigadier General during World War II

== See also ==
- Kornie, a village in Gmina Lubycza Królewska, Tomaszów County, Lublin Voivodeship, Poland
- Korn (disambiguation)
- Corn (disambiguation)
- Corne (disambiguation)
