= Q107 =

Q107 is the on-air brand name of several radio stations in Canada and the United States. Stations using this brand name typically broadcast within the 106.9 to 107.9 range on the FM radio, and have the letter Q in their call sign, often as the final letter.

Stations using this identifier include:

Canada

- CFGQ-FM, in Calgary, Alberta
- CILQ-FM, in Toronto, Ontario

United States

- KKEQ, in Fosston, Minnesota/Grand Forks, North Dakota
- KQRN, in Mitchell, South Dakota
- KTBQ, in Lufkin, Texas
- WCGQ, in Columbus, Georgia
- WJSE, in Wildwood, New Jersey
- WMQT, in Marquette, Michigan
- WQLT-FM, in Florence, Alabama
- WSAQ, in Port Huron, Michigan

Former stations using this identifier include:

- WKQB-FM (1977–1991), in Charleston, South Carolina, now WNKT, in Eastover, South Carolina
- WRRQ (2006–2013), in Binghamton, New York, now WCDW
- WRQX (1979–1990), in Washington, D.C., now WLVW
- WHBQ-FM (2010s-2020), in Memphis, Tennessee

Northern Ireland

- Seven FM
