= Corny =

Corny may refer to:

== Places ==
- Corny, Eure, a town in northern France
- Corny Lake, Minnesota, United States

== People ==
- Emmanuel Héré de Corny (1705–1763), French architect
- Kuźma Čorny (1900–1944), Byelorussian Soviet poet, writer, dramatist and journalist
- Corny Collins (born 1933), German former actress
- Cornelius Johnson (athlete) (1913–1946), American high jumper
- Cornelius Corny Littmann (born 1953), German entrepreneur
- Cornelius Corny Ostermann (1911–1940s), German musician and jazz bandleader

== Other uses ==
- Corny (Veronica Mars), a TV character
- Cornelius keg, also known as a Corny, a stainless steel soft drink container

== See also ==
- Corny-sur-Moselle, a town in north-eastern France
- Kitsch
- Camp (style)
