= Corn (disambiguation) =

Corn most often refers to maize, the yellow, large-grained crop native to the Americas.

It can also refer to the main cereal crop of a country or region:

- Wheat, barley and oats in England and Wales
- Oats in Scotland and Ireland

Corn may also refer to:

== Places ==
- Corn, Lot, France
- Corn, Oklahoma, United States

== People ==
- Corn (surname), and persons with the name
- Corn Griffin (1911–1973), American heavyweight boxer

== Other uses ==
- Corn (color)
- Corn (film), a 2004 movie
- Corn (pathology), an ingrowing callus often on the foot
- Corn, a type of snow

== See also ==
- Corne (disambiguation)
- Corny (disambiguation)
- Korn (disambiguation)
- Maize (disambiguation)
- Quorn (disambiguation)
