= Eric Corne =

Visual artist, curator, director, and author (b. 1957)

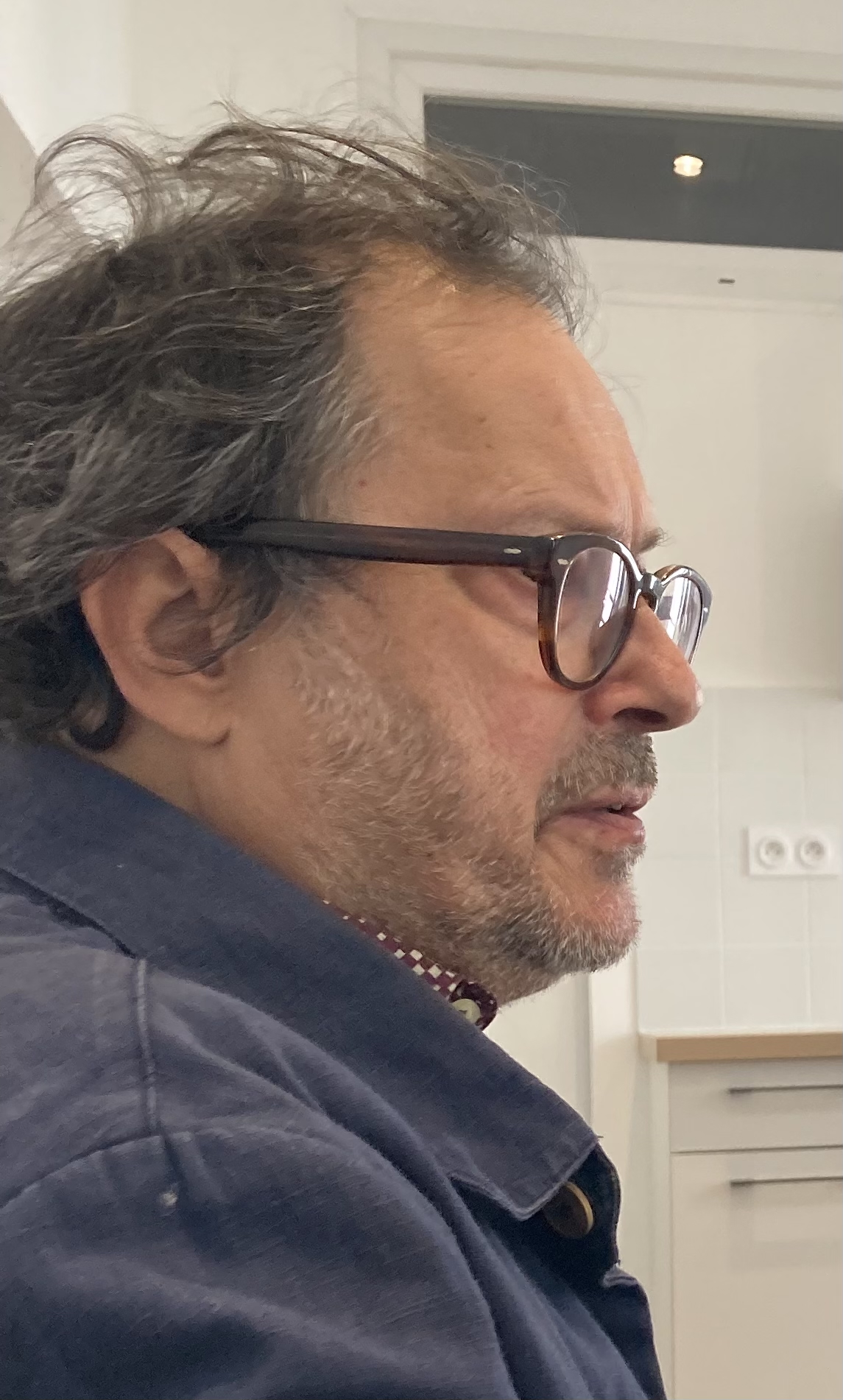
Eric Corne in 2023

Éric Corne (born 30 October 1957 in Flixecourt, France) is a visual artist, curator, professor, and author based in Paris. He creates paintings, works on paper, and video art. His artworks have been presented internationally. He also works as curator and artistic director at contemporary art institutions in Europe and South America.

== Education ==
Éric Corne grew up in the Picardy region of northern France. He turned to visual arts after two years of medical studies at the University of Amiens. In 1983, he graduated from the École régionale supérieure d'expression plastique and 1985 from the École nationale supérieure des Arts Décoratifs (ENSAD) in Paris. He also earned a master's degree in art history from the University Charles de Gaulle of Lille III in 1995.

During his studies, Corne developed a sustained interest in the history of painting alongside his own artistic practice, with particular attention to Italian Primitives and Early Netherlandish art, as well as modern and contemporary painting. He has also cited cinema and literature as significant influences.

== Artistic practice ==
Corne works primarily as a painter, using oil. He also integrates drawing, lithography, and video art. He creates interconnected, enigmatic scenes filled with unsettling details that reference art history, literature, and mythology, as well as for his use of bright colors and impastoed surfaces.

=== Evolution ===
From around 1989, Corne's work was associated with the movement La nouvelle figuration (New French Figuration), employing serial and conceptual approaches. By the early 2000s, following a year-long pause and exposure to non-European art, he turned toward more scenic and complex figurative compositions, which were largely marginalized within France's public contemporary art institutions. Critics have described his visual repertoire as "outside conventional painting codes" and offering experiences "rarely encountered" in contemporary art. One noted that, unusually, he "does not shy away from meaning, ideas, or emotion". In several works, such as Being Beauteous (2014–2015) and Rideaux jaunes (2015), Corne explored the role of the marginalized artist by depicting himself with large, grotesque, anti-heroic clown shoes, while earlier works such as Corps à cœur persuadé par les nuages noirs (2013) feature oversized boxing gloves, metaphorically suggesting a provocateur with tied hands.

=== Paintings ===
Corne's paintings are of interlinked scenes ranging from portraits and still lifes to interiors, urban spaces, and landscapes. Critics have described them as "articulated, complex, and yet all in one block", lacking clear boundaries between genres or between "the center and the periphery, the dream and the nightmare". Corne sometimes distorts proportions or employs multiple viewpoints. He has stated, "I believe I film in painting", noting that compositional "cuts and drifting islands" prevent any fixed narrative.

Motifs may appear awkward or deliberately simplified, suggesting, according to David Rosenberg, a visual language that "makes things less obvious, but also more passionate". Rosenberg speaks of Corne's "potential images", drawing on Early Netherlandish painting and its "hidden mysticism". Allegorical titles add further interpretive layers. Themes of "tragedy, beauty, madness, death, circus, and melancholy" run throughout his work. Scenes of grace—likened to a "beautiful poem"—coexist with depictions of "power, soldiering, aggression, mutilation, madness, derision, loneliness, [and] strangeness". Critics interpret these contrasts as expressing "the hope for a better world" alongside "a terrifying disconcertment in the face of the chaos of the world". Corne concurred with a critic's reference to Rilke's idea that beauty "is nothing but the beginning of terror".

Corne develops his paintings gradually and without preparatory drawings or projections, describing the process as "an experience of the unknown". Since around 2015 he has favored a bright palette, notably intense blues. Some argue that "he is obsessed with light". Color and light have been described as both a compositional tool and an objective in its own right. Laurent Buffet characterizes his colors as the painter's "exile" and "paradise" after modernism's rejection of figuration. Others emphasize the materiality of his paint as "more real than reality itself", applied in controlled impasto to create scenes suspended in time and space. Corne relates this sensibility for the colors and materials to his northern French background and also cites writers, filmmakers, and travel as influences.

Described as a "painter's painter", Corne creates "dialogues between painting and painting", referencing artists such as Piero della Francesca, Nicolas Dipre, Claude Monet, Francis Bacon, Paula Rego, Pablo Picasso, Max Beckmann, Philip Guston, and Charlotte Salomon.

=== Works on paper ===
Since 2000, Corne has made black-and-white drawings in pencil or charcoal alongside his brightly colored oil paintings. The lines often appear searching and the forms deliberately awkward, suggesting open, unresolved shapes. This approach also applies to his smaller-scale prints. Both drawings and prints are regarded as independent works rather than preparatory studies for paintings.

=== Video ===
Corne has made video works. These real-time collapses of objects and buildings evoke collapsing hopes and hierarchies. Guy Tortosa sees them as "the accumulation—rather than the flattening—of being, thought, painting, architecture, and the entire modern project" and as homages to "Serra, Smithson, Heizer, Matta-Clark, Haus-Rucker-Co, Sarkis, Ruthenbeck, and Gasiorowski", asking whether a "new world" might arise from "nowhere".

== Exhibitions ==
Éric Corne's works have been presented since 1995 in almost 40 solo exhibitions and group shows in France and elsewhere. They have been discussed extensively in numerous reviews and texts. Recent exhibitions include the 59th October Salon in Belgrade where Corne was exhibited at the National Museum of Serbia; Désordres from the Antoine de Galbert Collection at the Musée d'art contemporain de Lyon, France; Le Jour des peintres at the Musée d'Orsay in Paris; and the inaugural exhibition Empreintes in the Chapelle PDP in Pézenaz, France.

== Collections ==
Corne's paintings and paper works are in both private and public collections, including the Fondation Antoine de Galbert, the collection Marin Karmitz, the Fonds d'art contemporain - Paris Collections, the Fonds régional d'art contemporain d'Île de France, the Centre national des arts plastiques, the Strasbourg Museum of Modern and Contemporary Art, and the URDLA.

== Curating and directing ==
=== Curator ===
Since 1999, Éric Corne has organised numerous solo and thematic exhibitions at in European and Brazilian art institutions. Among them were retrospectives of Gérard Fromanger and Charlotte Salomon (Berardo Collection Museum Lisbon), the traveling exhibitions Quel amour?! (Berardo Collection Museum Lisbon and Musée d'Art Contemporain de la Ville de Marseille (MAC)), From Torres Garcia to Viera de Silva (Institut Valencià d'Art Modern (IVAM) Valencia; Berardo Collection Museum Lisbon) and Voir en peinture (Le Plateau Paris; Berardo Collection Museum Lisbon,; Museum of the Ujazdów Castle Warsaw Gallery La Box Bourges,), as well as monographic shows including Henri Barande – Nice To Be Dead (Exhibition space École des Beaux Arts Paris), Éric Poitevin (Le Plateau Paris), and Arte na França: 1860–1960: o realismo (São Paulo Museum of Art (MASP)).

=== Founder, artistic director ===
In 2002, Corne founded Le Plateau, a contemporary art exhibition centre in the east of Paris, and was its artistic director for three years, as he had planned from the outset, in partnership with the Frac Île-de-France. The institution was established through the efforts of the citizens' initiative Vivre aux Buttes-Chaumont, chaired by Corne, in response to urban redevelopment driven by the private investor Bouygues. At Le Plateau, he helped revive interest in contemporary painting through exhibitions such as Voir en peinture, with painters including Miriam Cahn, Andrzej Wróblewski, Walter Swennen, and Loris Gréaud, through their first exhibitions in France, alongside Corne's engagement with other contemporary media. The square in front of the venue was named Place Hannah Arendt at his initiative.

During the France – Brazil Season in 2009, Corne was invited by the Conseil régional d'Île-de-France to develop the cultural centre Cidade Tiradentes (now Centro de formação cultural Cidade Tiradentes) in a favela near São Paulo and to coordinate a cross-residency project which he named Le Monde n'appartient à personne. French participants included Hans-Walter Müller, who created a site-specific inflatable Moving Architecture referencing Oscar Niemeyer's OCA, and filmmaker Justine Triet, who produced her first medium-length film, Les ombres dans la maison (2010) Brazilian participants included Nunca, who created a mural, and the group BijaRi, who produced a video and an intervention in Vitry-sur-Seine.

As part of his activities as curator and artistic director, Corne has written numerous texts and edited many exhibition catalogs.

== Teaching ==
From 2005 to 2008, Corne was a professor of painting at the Geneva University of Art and Design (HEAD), before taking up a professorship at the École nationale supérieure d'art de Bourges (ENSA Bourges), which he held until his retirement in 2023.

== Honours ==
In 2022, Corne was appointed Officier de l'ordre des Arts et des Lettres.

== Personal life ==
Éric Corne is married with art historian Maike Aden and has three children: James, Juliette, and Simone.

== Books on Éric Corne ==
· Lucas Hees: Éric Corne dans son élément, Paris: Édition Caedere, 2009
· Yannick Haenel; Olivier Kaeppelin (ed.): Éric Corne. Lost Lights, Luxembourg: Nosmaum & Reding, 2010
