= Corne =

Corne, Cornè, Corné or Cornes may refer to:

== Places ==
- Corne de Sorebois, a mountain in the Pennine Alps in Switzerland
- La Corne, Quebec, a municipality in the Canadian province of Quebec
- Corné, a commune in the Maine-et-Loire department in France
- Corne (river), a tributary of the Saône in the Saône-et-Loire department in France

== People ==
=== Given name ===
- Corne Bodenstein (born 1992), South African-born cricketer for Jersey
- Corné Dry (born 1993), South African cricketer
- Corné Du Plessis (born 1978), South African sprinter
- Corné Fourie (born 1988), South African rugby union player
- Corné Krige (born 1975), South African rugby union player
- Corne Nel, South African rugby league player
- Corné Steenkamp (born 1982), South African rugby union player
- Corné van Kessel (born 1991), Dutch cyclist

=== Surname ===
- Éric Corne (born 1957), French artist
- Louis de la Corne, Chevalier de la Corne (1703–1761), Franco-Canadian soldier
- Luc de la Corne (1711–1784), Franco-Canadian soldier, brother of the above
- Michele Felice Cornè (1752–1845), Italian-American painter
- Chad Cornes (born 1979), Australian footballer
- Chris Cornes (born 1986), English footballer
- Graham Cornes (born 1948), Australian footballer
- Jerry Cornes (1910–2001), English middle-distance runner
- Kane Cornes (born 1983), Australian footballer
- Lee Cornes (born 1951), English actor
- Nicole Cornes (born 1970), Australian political candidate

== See also ==
- Corn (disambiguation)
- Korn (disambiguation)
- Korne (disambiguation)
