= KORN-FM =

- Parkston, South Dakota; United States
- Broadcast area: Mitchell and Huron areas
- Frequency: 92.1 MHz
- Branding: KORN Country 92.1

Programming
- Format: Mainstream country

Ownership
- Owner: Nancy Nedved and Steve Nedved; (Nedved Media, LLC)
- Sister stations: KORN (AM); KQRN

History
- First air date: 1994
- Former call signs: KZTS (1991–1992); KZKK (1992–2015)
- Former frequencies: 105.1 MHz (1994–2016)
- Call sign meaning: Corn Palace (with "KORN" = "Corn")

Technical information
- Licensing authority: FCC
- Facility ID: 15267
- Class: C1
- ERP: 100,000 watts
- HAAT: 106 meters (348 ft)
- Transmitter coordinates: 43°42′11.9″N 97°59′51.3″W

Links
- Public license information: Public file; LMS
- Webcast: Listen live
- Website: www.korncountry921.com

KORN-FM (92.1 FM, "KORN Country 92.1"), is a country music radio station with its studio based in Mitchell, South Dakota. Its license is assigned to Parkston, South Dakota, and its transmitter and antenna tower are located in Huron, South Dakota. The station serves the Mitchell, South Dakota Micropolitan Statistical Area, and the Huron, South Dakota areas (which combined create the Mitchell-Huron media region). The station is owned by Nancy and Steve Nedved, through licensee Nedved Media, LLC. KORN-FM plays a mainstream country format, in a similar format to its Top 40 rock/pop sister KQRN (Q107.3).

== Station history ==
The station (under callsign KZKK) was originally owned by Dakota Communications, and licensed in Huron, South Dakota. By 2015, KZKK was acquired by Riverfront Broadcasting LLC of Yankton, South Dakota. The purchase allowed KZKK to become Riverfront Broadcasting's third station in the Mitchell area, along with KORN and KQRN. Riverfront Broadcasting LLC's ownership moved KZKK's studios to 400 N. Rowley Street in Mitchell, South Dakota, where it occupies a shared facility with KORN and KQRN.

The Federal Communications Commission (FCC) issued callsign of KZKK was used by the station from November 27, 1992, until 2015, when Riverfront Broadcasting LLC requested it to be changed. As of December 16, 2015, KORN Country was approved by the FCC to share its sister station KORN News Radio 1490's callsign of "KORN", granting the station the new callsign of KORN-FM. During its time in Huron as KZKK, the station was originally on the 105.1 MHz frequency.

KZKK was temporarily silent between the time of the purchase by Riverfront Broadcasting LLC, and retook the air on December 21, 2015, under its current form as KORN Country 92.1.

In late 2016, Riverfront Broadcasting LLC sold the station, along with KQRN and KORN, to Nancy & Steve Nedved. Effective Sunday, January 1, 2017, the three station group is now known as Nedved Media, LLC.
