= KORN (AM) =

- Mitchell, South Dakota; United States
- Broadcast area: Mitchell and Huron areas
- Frequency: 1490 kHz
- Branding: "KORN News Radio 1490"

Programming
- Format: Full service
- Affiliations: ABC News Radio; Fox Sports Radio; Genesis Communications Network; Premiere Networks; Salem Radio Network; Westwood One; South Dakota State Jackrabbits; Learfield Sports

Ownership
- Owner: Nancy Nedved and Steve Nedved; (Nedved Media, LLC)
- Sister stations: KQRN; KORN-FM

History
- First air date: 1947
- Call sign meaning: Corn Palace (with "KORN" = "Corn")

Technical information
- Licensing authority: FCC
- Facility ID: 35420
- Class: C
- Power: 1,000 watts unlimited
- Transmitter coordinates: 43°42′13.9″N 97°59′58.3″W
- Translator: 101.3 K267CN (Mitchell)

Links
- Public license information: Public file; LMS
- Webcast: Listen live
- Website: kornradio.com

KORN (1490 kHz, KORN News Radio 1490) is an AM radio station licensed to serve Mitchell, South Dakota. The station is owned by Nancy and Steve Nedved, through licensee Nedved Media, LLC. It airs a full service format with a mix of news, talk and sports. The station offers a mix of local and syndicated programming including shows hosted by Rush Limbaugh, Sean Hannity, Ray Lucia, Jim Bohannon, and "Coast to Coast AM" with George Noory. It also features syndicated sports programing from ABC News Radio and Fox Sports Radio.

The station is the home of the Mitchell High School Kernels sports broadcasts, and is also the local affiliate for South Dakota State Jackrabbits sporting events (mainly football and men's & women's basketball) through Learfield Sports.

The station was assigned the call letters KORN by the Federal Communications Commission.

== History ==
The station was originally given the call sign KMHK, and went on the air between August and October 1947. For a few months in late 1950, the station used the call sign KORM. In 1950, after the call letters KORN had been given up by a station in Fremont, Nebraska that had recently become KFGT (and has subsequently become KHUB), the call sign KORN became available and was taken by the former KORM to take advantage of the tie-in with the Corn Palace.

Famed radio announcer Gary Owens, of Rowan & Martin's Laugh-In fame, started his radio career at KORN in 1952, where he served as News Director.

KORN News Radio 1490's former logo

KORN News Radio 1490's previous logo

== Ownership ==
In February 2008, Riverfront Broadcasting LLC of Yankton, South Dakota reached an agreement with NRG Media to purchase this station as part of a six station deal.

In late 2016, Riverfront Broadcasting LLC sold the station, along with sister stations KQRN, and KORN-FM to Nancy & Steve Nedved. Effective Sunday, January 1, 2017, the three station group is now known as Nedved Media, LLC.

== Honors and awards ==
In May 2006, KORN received two first place plaques in the commercial radio division of the South Dakota Associated Press Broadcasters Association news contest. The contest was for the 2005 calendar year.
