= Corna Trentapassi =

Mountain in Italy

Coordinates: 45°46′12″N 10°05′24″E

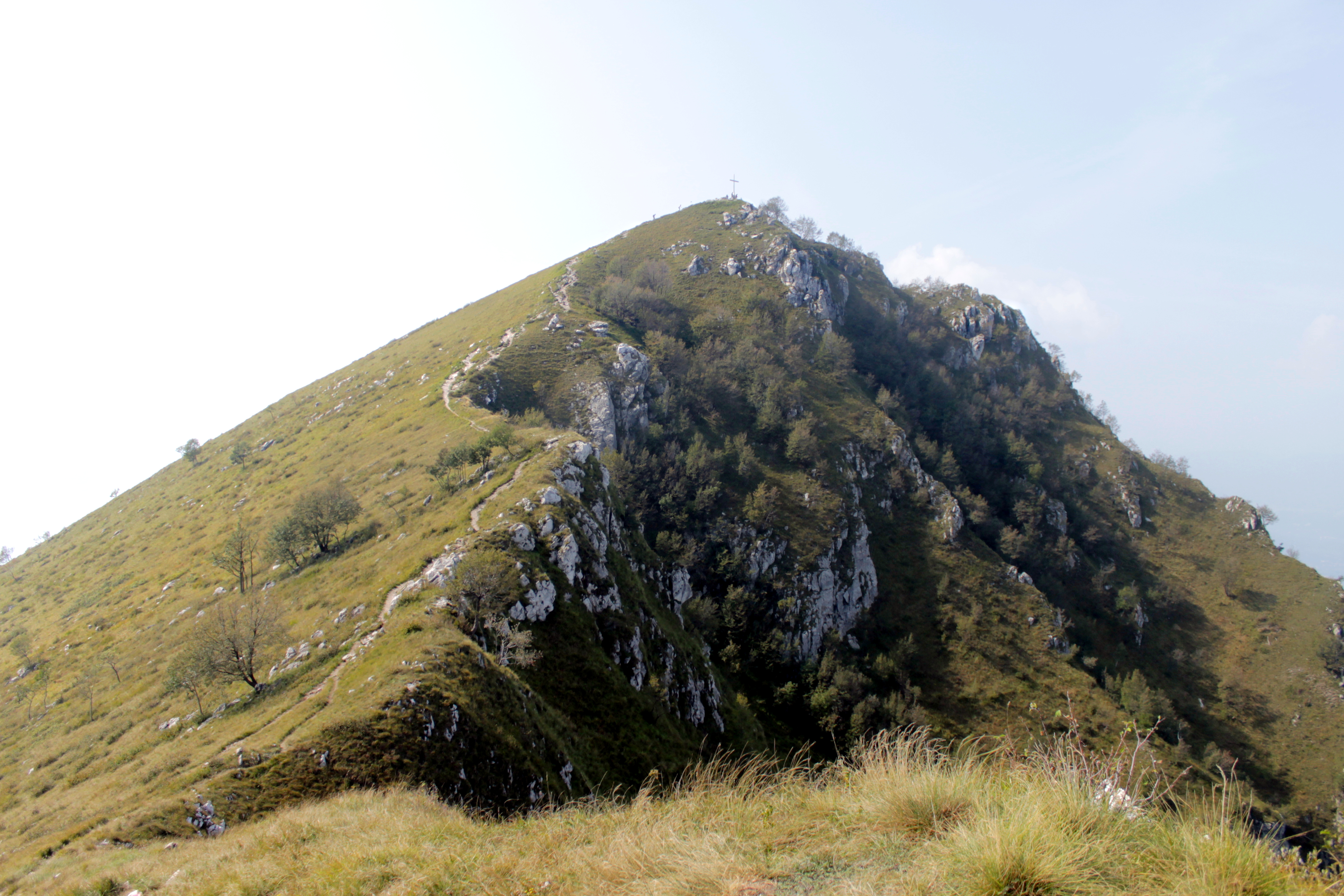

Highest point
- Elevation: 1,248 m (4,094 ft)

Geography
- Location: Lombardy, Italy

Corna Trentapassi is a mountain of the Brescia Pre-Alps in Italy. It is 1248m high, located on the eastern shore of Lake Iseo. It marks the beginning of Val Camonica. It is made up of limestone rocks which give it a harsh and steep aspect. Vegetation cover is scarce, especially on the barren southern slope.

Due to its position, isolated from the surrounding pre-alpine mountains and jutting out into the lake, the summit of the mountain is considered an excellent vantage point, despite its low altitude.

The Brescian name for Trentapassi is Trè Tapàs which means "three spikes", a term that describes the appearance of the mountain.

== Climbing ==
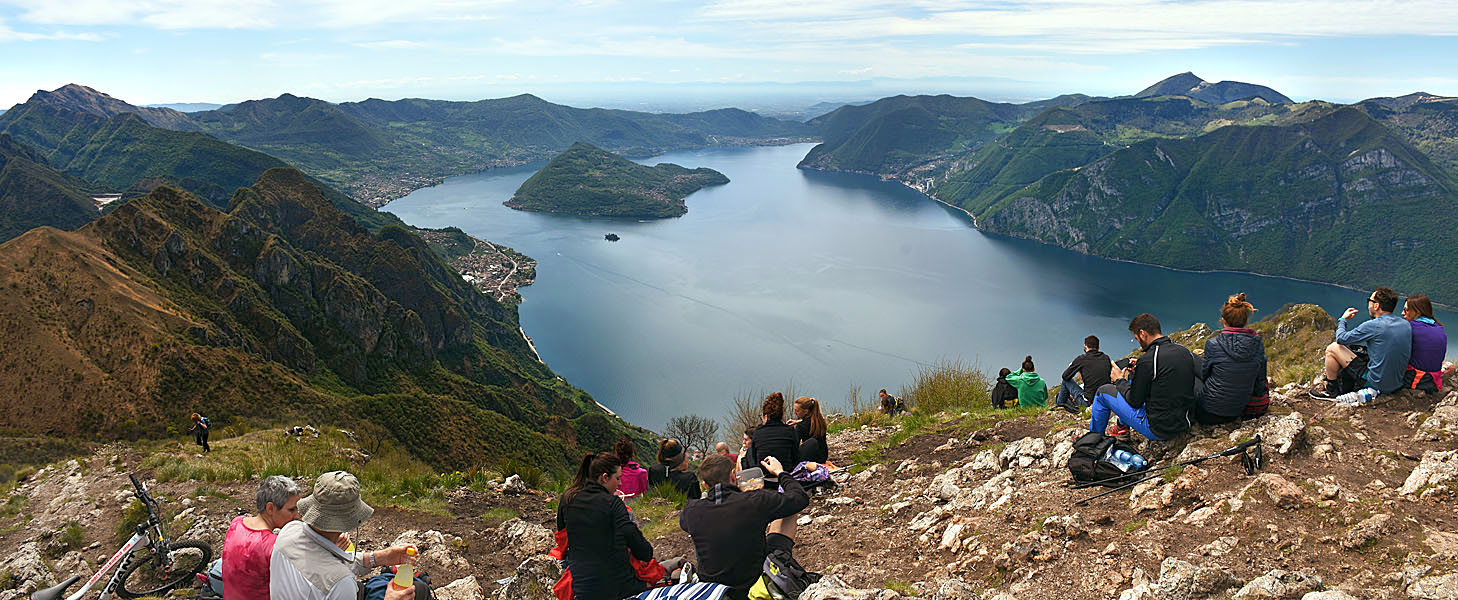
Panoramic view of Lake Iseo, looking south

There are several routes to climb to the summit: most of them are within the reach of hikers, as only the one facing the mountain from the north side presents technical difficulties. The possible presence of snow in the winter months makes these itineraries recommended from April to November.

The most difficult path (difficulty EEA) starts in Toline (188m), a hamlet southwest of Pisogne, following the trail marker CAI n. 212. Steep, it becomes a via ferrata (for which adequate equipment is required) in the final stretch, preceded and followed by some delicate passages on rocks. Suitable for trained and equipped hikers, it exceeds 1060m in height and it takes about 3 hours as a whole.

Two paths (CAI trail no. 263 and no. 265) run along the southern side of the mountain. The first (difficulty EE) has some delicate passages and takes 2 hours and 30 minutes, while the second is easier but longer (3 hours, difficulty E). Since 2011, these paths have been the scene of a spectacular foot race called the Trentapassi Skyrace.

In the hamlet of Cusato (689m), the shortest, and in many ways less demanding, route begins. Marked as CAI trail no. 229, it is initially a cobbled mule track at the bottom that climbs to the Coloreto hut (895m) and on to the saddle (942m) where it crosses other signposted paths and continues to the panoramic summit. Technically easy (difficulty E), it takes 1 hour and 30 minutes.
