= Nicolas Dipre =

French painter

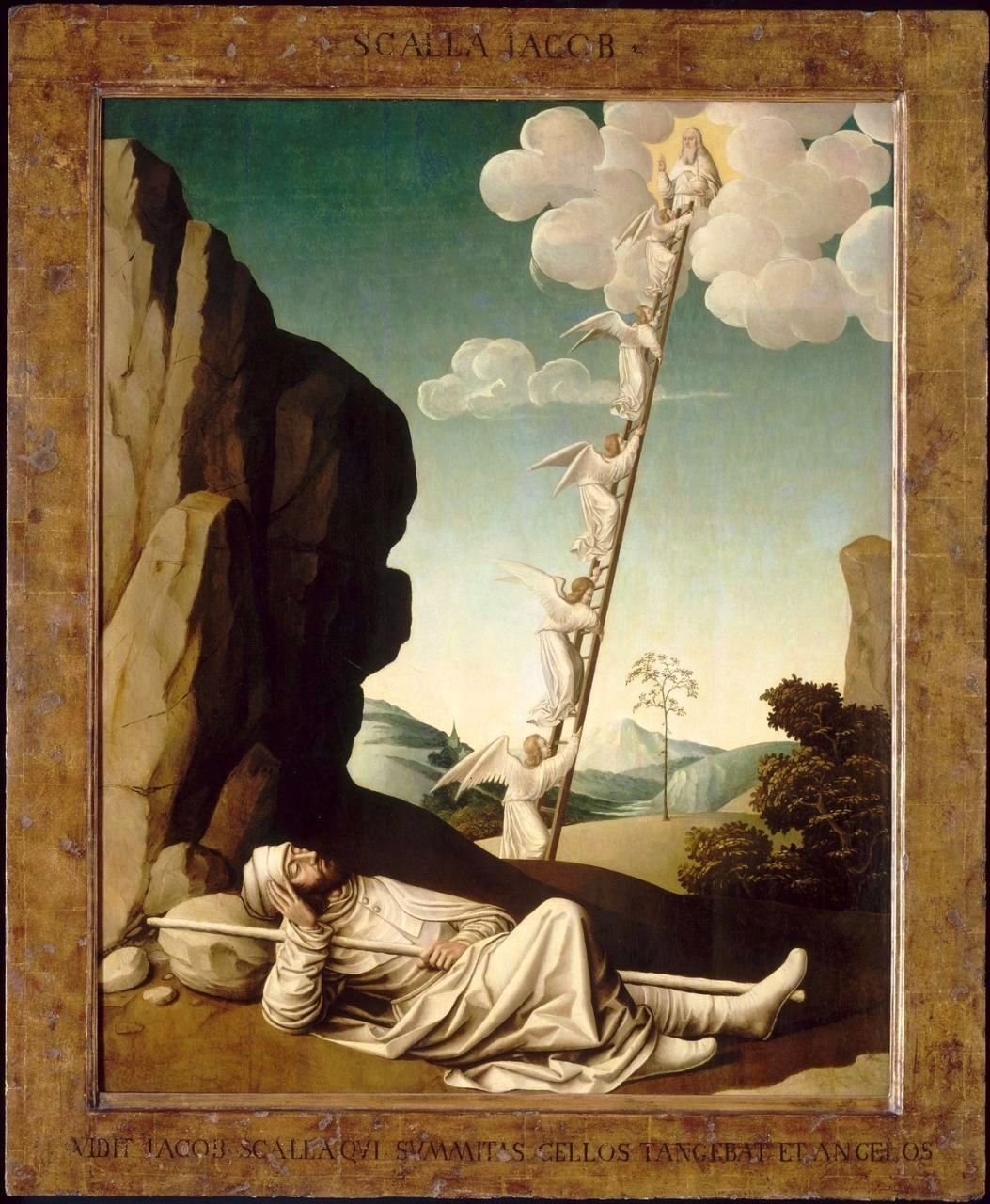
The painting Jacob's Ladder, showing the patriarch Jacob resting beside a road and seeing in a dream a ladder connecting earth to heaven.

Nicolas Dipre (French pronunciation: [nikɔla dipʁ]; sometimes also Nicolas d'Amiens, Nicolas d'Ypres, fl. c. 1495–1532) was a French early Renaissance painter. Among the Avignon artists of the late 15th and early 16th century, Nicola Dipre is among the most famous.

== Life and works ==
Nicolas Dipre was born in Paris. His family tree is not fully explored but it's presumed he came from a family of artists. The first written record of his existence dates from 1495, when he lived in Avignon, where he lived and worked most of his life, often working for the city government. In May 1508, he married Honorée Bigle, the daughter of joiner Jean Bigle, with whom he executed orders for the church and painted numerous pieces, the vast majority of which have been lost.

Apart from commissions to design numerous altarpieces, Dipre was also hired to design other forms of decorations, like processional banners and heraldry. An altarpiece created for the Carpentras Cathedral, for which Dipre was paid 115 florins, has survived in fragments and other works have been identified as having the same originator. Two of his most famous works are Jacob's Ladder, which symbolizes the epitome of the covenant of Abraham, the restoration of peace and communion between heaven and earth, and Gideon's Fleece, which illustrates the Old Testament story of Gideon, who called on the people of Israel to be their judge. He doubted his own abilities, but the Lord fulfilled his request.

== Selected works ==
- Presentation of the Virgin at the Temple (c. 1500)
- The Nativity of the Virgin
- Scenes from the Life of Mary
- Meeting of Anne and Joachim at the Golden Gate (1499)
- The Adoration of the Shepherds
