= Quorn (disambiguation) =

Quorn is a meat substitute.

Quorn may also refer to:

- Quorn, Leicestershire (or Quorndon), a village in England after which the meat substitute product is named
  - Quorn Hunt, a fox hunt in Leicestershire once based at Quorndon
  - HMS Quorn, one of three ships named after the hunt
  - Quorn F.C., a football club based in the village
- Quorn, South Australia, a town and locality in the Flinders Ranges
  - Quorn railway station, a railway station in South Australia

== See also ==
- Quern, a place in Germany
- Quern-stone, a tool for grinding
