= Stuttgart Psalter =

9th century Frankish illuminated manuscript

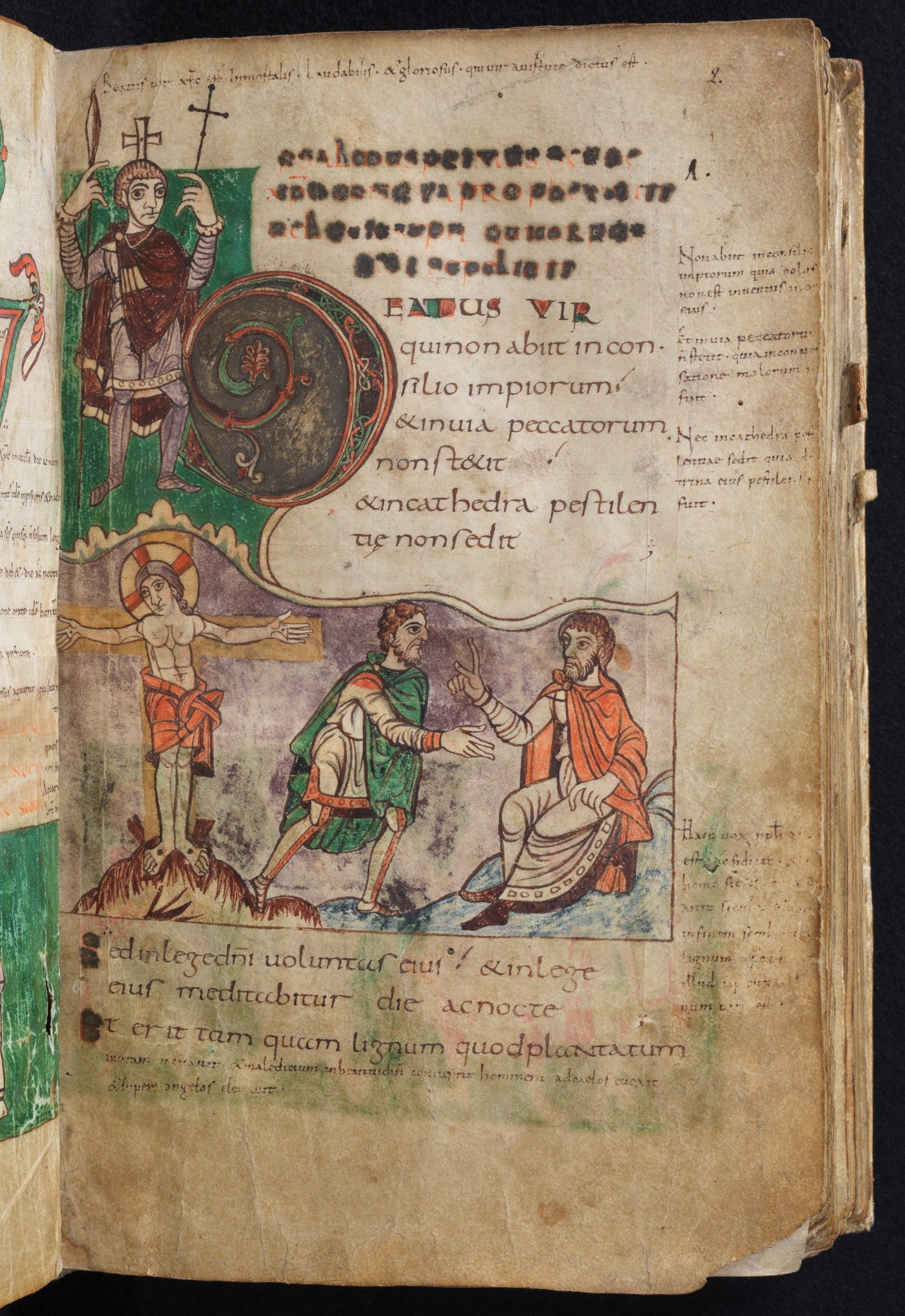
Beatus vir page, Psalm 1

The Stuttgart Psalter (Württembergische Landesbibliothek Stuttgart, Bibl. fol. 23) is a richly illuminated 9th-century psalter, considered one of the most significant of the Carolingian period. Written in Carolingian minuscule, it contains 316 images illustrating the Book of Psalms according to the Gallican Rite. It has been archived since the late 18th century at the Württembergische Landesbibliothek in Stuttgart.

== History ==
Through paleographic analysis undertaken by Bernhard Bischoff in the 1960s it is now commonly accepted that the manuscript originated around 820 at the scriptorium at Saint-Germain-des-Prés in Paris, a royal monastery which enjoyed the personal patronage of Charlemagne. The original owner or sponsor of the book is not known.

The first mention of the manuscript's existence occurs in a letter dated in 1787 regarding its sale to Charles Eugene, Duke of Württemberg, and its presence in the royal library at Stuttgart is recorded for the first time in 1818.

== Description ==
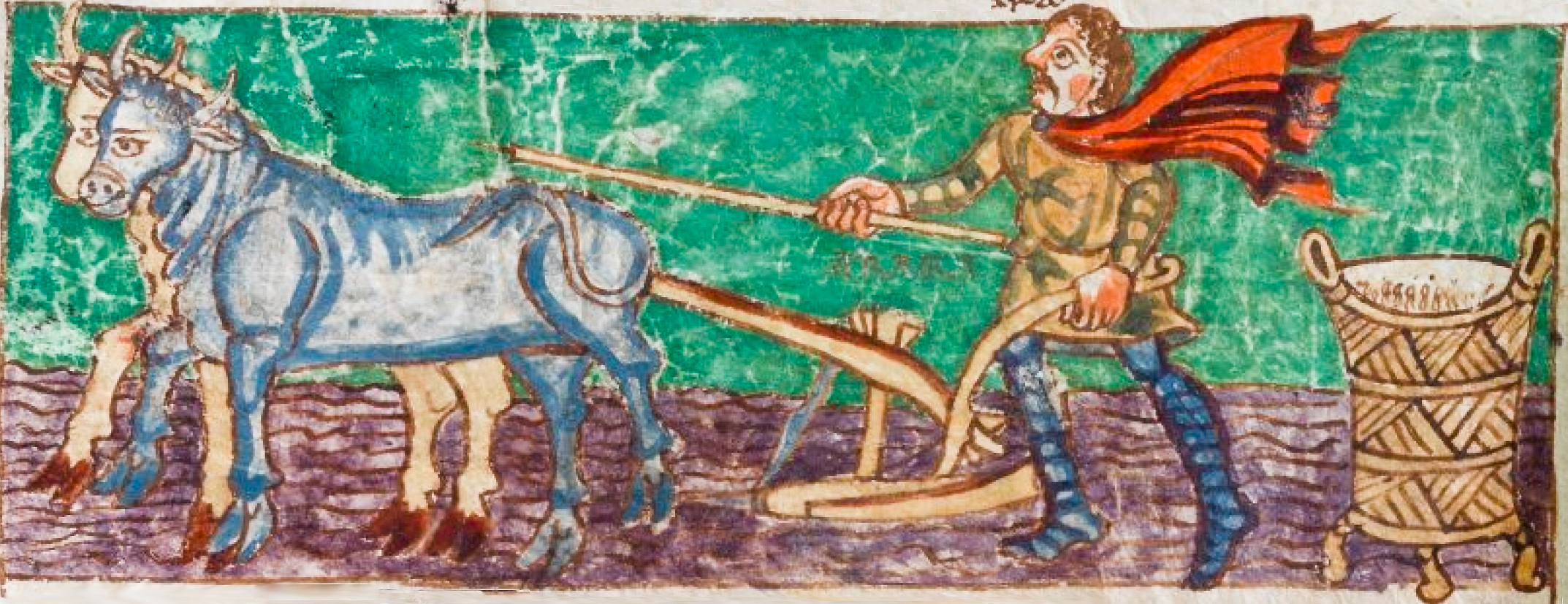

The Stuttgart Psalter contains 162 decorated initials, including one at the beginning of each psalm, which show floral, geometrical, zoomorphic, and interlaced patterns and motifs. The text is written in Carolingian minuscule. Two or three miniatures are included within each psalm text, which can be categorized in three ways: literal, illustrating the actual psalm text; historical, where the psalm text refers to other episodes in the Hebrew Bible; or Christological, where the text is seen as predictive or relevant to the life of Christ in the New Testament.

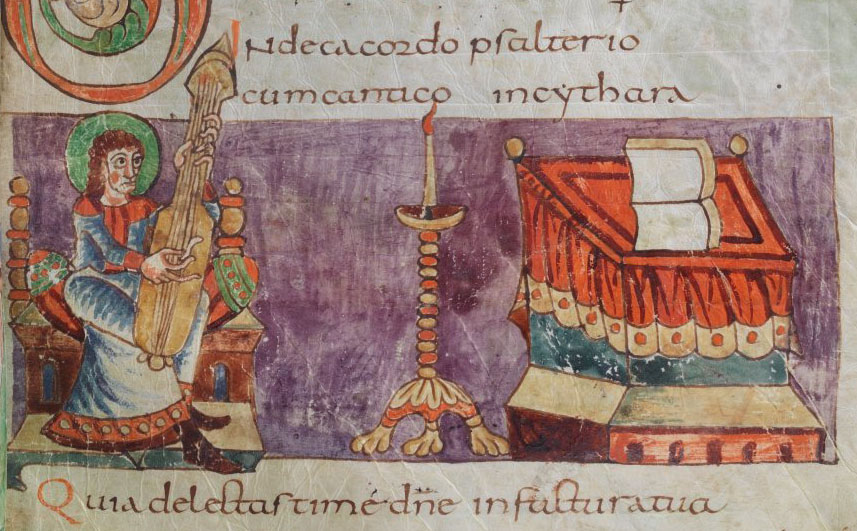

The Stuttgart Psalter is of great interest to Carolingian historians because of the detail and variety of the contemporary objects it portrays, a partial list of which might include: plants and animals, architecture, battles and militaria, dress and fashion, gender roles, appearance of Frankish nobles, demonology, farming, representation of imagined Jews, hunting and farming techniques, church ritual and priestly vestments, musical instruments, and more. The manuscript also features an array of monsters, unicorns, animals, allegorical figures, and likely the first depictions of a bellows-driven pipe organ and a "green man" in the early Middle Ages.

== Bibliography ==
- Davezac, Bertrand M. Maurice. The Stuttgart Psalter: Its Pre-Carolingian Sources and Its Place in Carolingian Art. Ph.D. Dissertation, Columbia University, 1971.
- DeWald, Ernest T. The Stuttgart Psalter: Biblia folio 23, Württembergische Landesbibliothek, Stuttgart. Princeton: Department of Art and Archaeology of Princeton University, 1930. (Facsimile and commentary.)
- Dodwell, C. R. The Pictorial Arts of the West, 800-1200. New Haven: Yale University Press, 1993.
- Mindell, Zoe. "Stuttgart Psalter". Grove Art Online. Oxford Art Online. Oxford University Press, accessed July 13, 2015. http://www.oxfordartonline.com/subscriber/article/grove/art/T2220449.
- Trost, Vera, Andrea Pataki, and Enke Huhsmann. Der Stuttgarter Psalter: Katalog zur Ausstellung vom 9. April bis 21. Mai 2011. Stuttgart: Württembergische Landesbibliothek, 2011.
- Württembergische Landesbibliothek. Der Stuttgarter Bilderpsalter. Bibl. fol. 23, Württembergische Landesbibliothek, Stuttgart. Stuttgart: Schreiber, 1968. (Facsimile and commentary.)
