= KQRN =

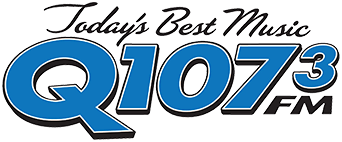
- Mitchell, South Dakota; United States
- Broadcast area: Mitchell and Huron areas
- Frequency: 107.3 MHz
- Branding: Q107.3

Programming
- Format: Adult hits, top 40 rock and pop hits

Ownership
- Owner: Nancy Nedved and Steve Nedved; (Nedved Media, LLC)
- Sister stations: KORN (AM); KORN-FM

History
- First air date: 1980
- Call sign meaning: disambiguation of sister stations KORN (AM) and KORN-FM

Technical information
- Licensing authority: FCC
- Facility ID: 35503
- Class: C1
- ERP: 100,000 watts
- HAAT: 110 meters (360 ft)
- Transmitter coordinates: 43°42′13.9″N 97°59′58.2″W

Links
- Public license information: Public file; LMS
- Webcast: Listen live
- Website: www.q107radio.com

KQRN (107.3 FM, "Q107.3") is a radio station licensed in Mitchell, South Dakota, which serves the Mitchell, South Dakota Micropolitan Statistical Area, and Huron areas (which make up the Mitchell-Huron media market). The station is owned by Nancy and Steve Nedved, through licensee Nedved Media, LLC. It airs an adult hits and a top 40 rock and pop music format.

The station was assigned the KQRN call letters by the Federal Communications Commission.

Q107.3's old logo.

== Ownership ==
In February 2008, Riverfront Broadcasting LLC of Yankton, South Dakota, reached an agreement with NRG Media to purchase this station as part of a six station deal.

In late 2016, Riverfront Broadcasting LLC sold the station, along with sister stations KORN, and KORN-FM, to Nancy & Steve Nedved. Effective Sunday, January 1, 2017, the three station group is now known as Nedved Media, LLC.
