= Corny Ostermann =

German bandleader

Corny Ostermann, born Cornelius Andreas Oostermann (born September 18, 1911, in Linden (now part of Hannover)–died during the Second World War; officially declared dead in 1949) was a German musician and jazz bandleader.

Osterman was active with a swing orchestra in Berlin in the late 1930s despite the Nazi government's ban on swing music. Between 1938 and 1943 he recorded shellacs with his orchestra, some of them re-edited later. As late as 1943, he was playing in the orchestra of Helmut Gardens. After his conscription into Wehrmacht, he went missing and was officially declared dead in 1949.

== Literature ==
- Jürgen Wölfer: Jazz in Deutschland – Das Lexikon. Alle Musiker und Plattenfirmen von 1920 bis heute. Hannibal Verlag: Höfen 2008, ISBN 978-3-85445-274-4.
