= Stellidia =

Scientific classification
- Kingdom: Animalia
- Phylum: Arthropoda
- Class: Insecta
- Order: Lepidoptera
- Superfamily: Noctuoidea
- Family: Erebidae
- Subfamily: Calpinae
- Genus: Stellidia; Guenée, 1857

Synonyms
- Corna Walker, 1865

Genus of moths

Stellidia is a genus of moths of the family Erebidae. The genus was erected by Achille Guenée in 1857.

== Species ==
- Stellidia albipunctaria Schaus, 1901
- Stellidia annuligera Dognin, 1914
- Stellidia concinna Schaus, 1913
- Stellidia estella Jones, 1912
- Stellidia inconspicua Walker, 1865
- Stellidia micraster Dognin, 1914
- Stellidia micrasteria Hampson, 1926
- Stellidia nivosita Schaus, 1904
- Stellidia ocina Druce, 1900
- Stellidia oenopion Schaus, 1914
- Stellidia ofella Schaus, 1914
- Stellidia planetaria Guenée, 1857
- Stellidia pygmaea Schaus, 1916
- Stellidia rama Schaus, 1913
- Stellidia recinna Dognin, 1914
- Stellidia stellata Schaus, 1912
- Stellidia tritonias Hampson, 1926
- Stellidia variata Schaus, 1914
