= Corny Lake =

Lake in the state of Minnesota, United States

- Location within Minnesota
- Location: Cook County, Minnesota, United States
- Coordinates: 47°47′46″N 90°46′56″W
- Primary outflows: Poplar River
- Basin countries: United States
- Surface area: 11 acres (0 km^{2})

Corny Lake is an 11-acre lake in Cook County, Minnesota which is a tributary to the Poplar River.
