= Corna (Lycaonia) =

Town of ancient Lycaonia

Coordinates: 37°29′21″N 32°28′01″E

Corna or Korna was a town of ancient Lycaonia, inhabited in Byzantine times. It became a bishopric; no longer the seat of a residential bishop, it remains a titular see of the Roman Catholic Church.

Its site is tentatively located near Dinorna hüyük, known as Orhaniye in Akören district, Konya Province Turkey.
