= God of Étang-sur-Arroux =

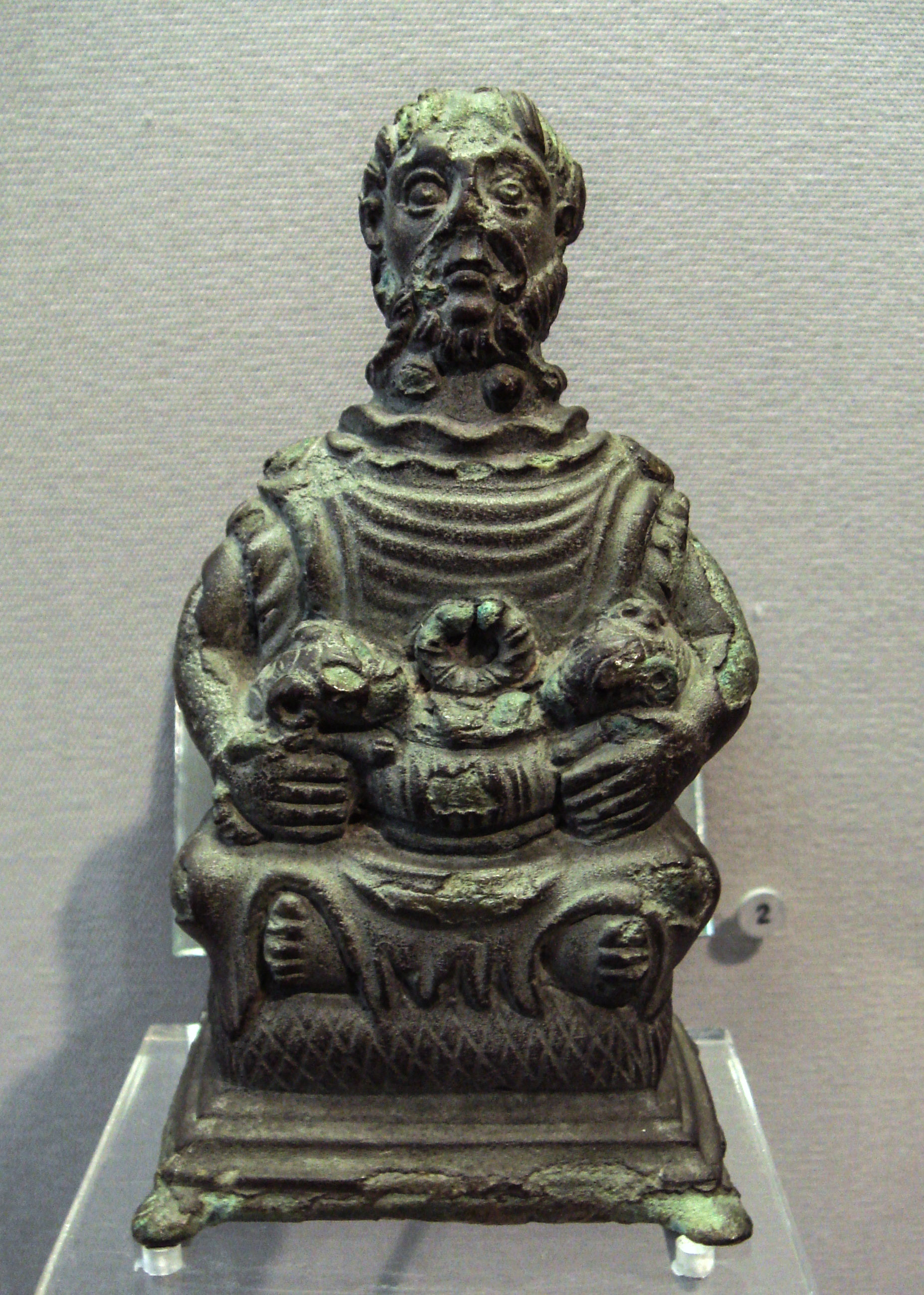
The God of Étang-sur-Arroux

The God of Étang-sur-Arroux (or Autun statuette) is a Gallo-Roman bronze statuette, probably found in the commune of Étang-sur-Arroux, not far from Autun, France.

The statuette is of a bearded figure sat cross legged with two ram-headed, fish-tailed serpents feeding from a basket in his hands. The horned serpents and holes in the head for antlers identify this as a representation of the Gaulish stag god Cernunnos. One peculiar feature, the presence of small human faces above each ear, has been commented on.

The statuette is in the collection of the National Archaeological Museum, France.

== Discovery ==
The statuette was found in 1840. Its exact findspot is uncertain. J.-G. Buillot (writing in 1889) indicated that it was found near a ford, known as gué de la Perrière, of the river Arroux (in the commune of Étang-sur-Arroux, Saône-et-Loire). The inventory of the National Archaeological Museum indicates, on the contrary, that the findspot was in Savigny (in the commune of Curgy, Saône-et-Loire). Savigny is not implausible, as there is evidence of a very ancient road through the town. However, the authors of the Carte archéologique de la Gaule lean towards the Perrière provenance, as a find of a similar nature (a bronze boar with some Gallic and Roman coins) is recorded a few hundred meters further south.

The statue was acquired in 1870 for the National Archaeological Museum.

== Description ==
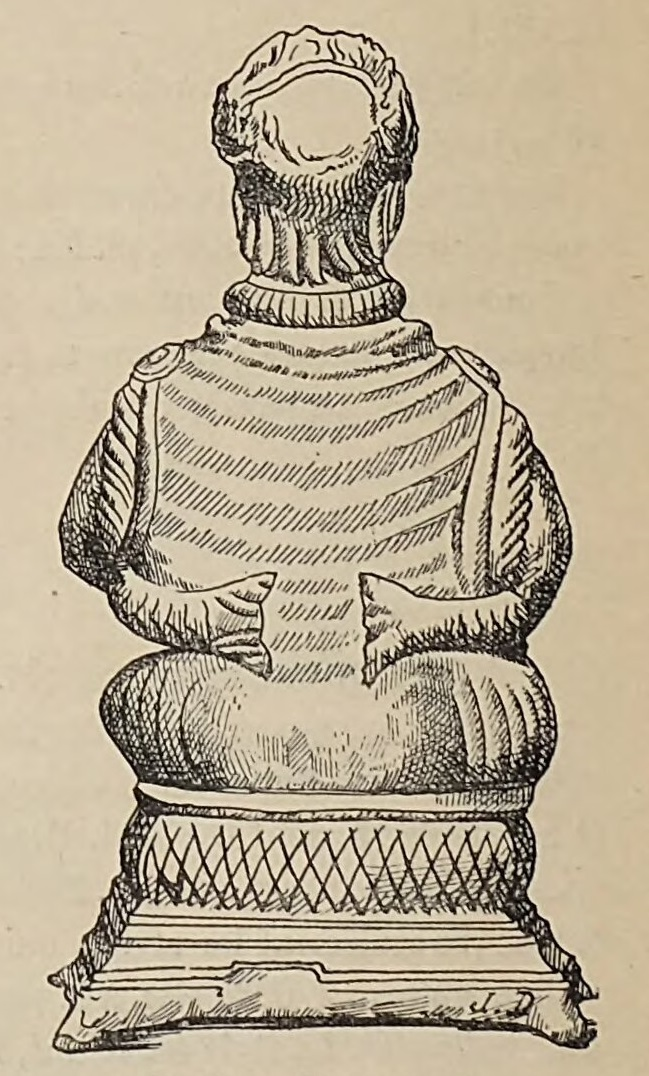
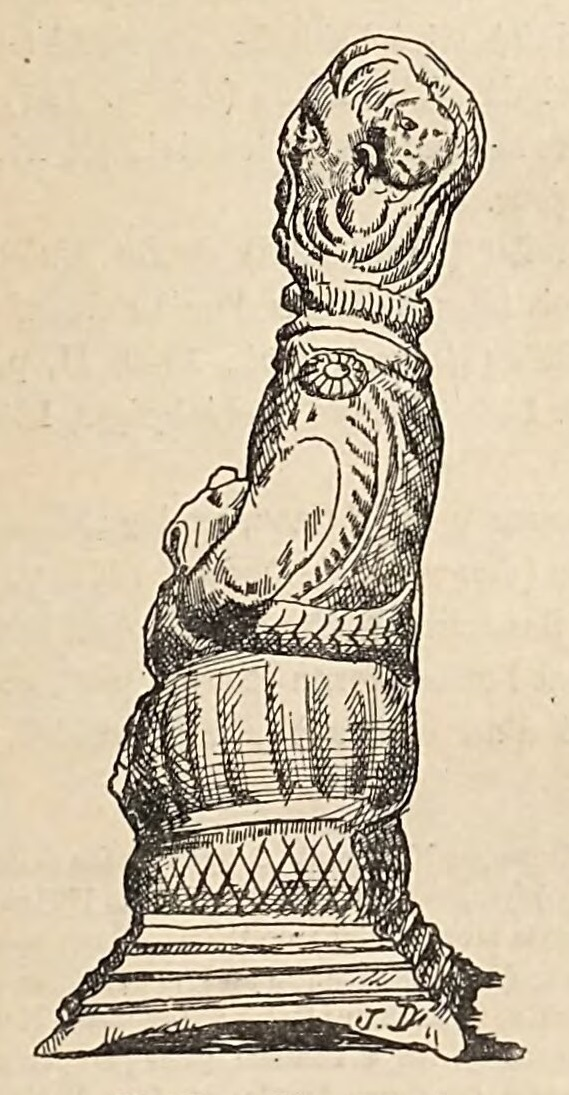
The back and profile of the God of Étang-sur-Arroux. Observe the fish tails and the face above the left ear.

The statuette is cast from bronze. It measures 108mm tall and 57mm wide. The statuette is on a molded base, with four small cubes serving as feet. It is well-preserved, but has a patina.

The statuette is of a male figure sat cross-legged on a cross-hatched cushion. The figure is aged, with a high forehead, beard and moustache. His hair is rendered in individual locks. He wears a torc around his neck and a sleeveless tunic, fastened to each shoulder by a fibula. Two serpents, with ram heads and fish tails, are wrapped around his waist. He holds a basket in his hands, from which the two serpents appear to feed or drink. A second torc is balanced atop the basket. Two small holes (about 4mm deep), made after the statuette was cast, are present at the top of the head. These holes have traces of lead, probably used to fix whatever was placed in them.

Two small bearded faces are visible above the right and left ears of the figure. The face above the right ear is almost entirely obscured by oxidation, excepting the beard. The face above the left has a damaged beard. Hélène Chew notes that a slight protuberance on the back of the head could suggest a third face (damaged beyond recognition).

== Interpretation ==
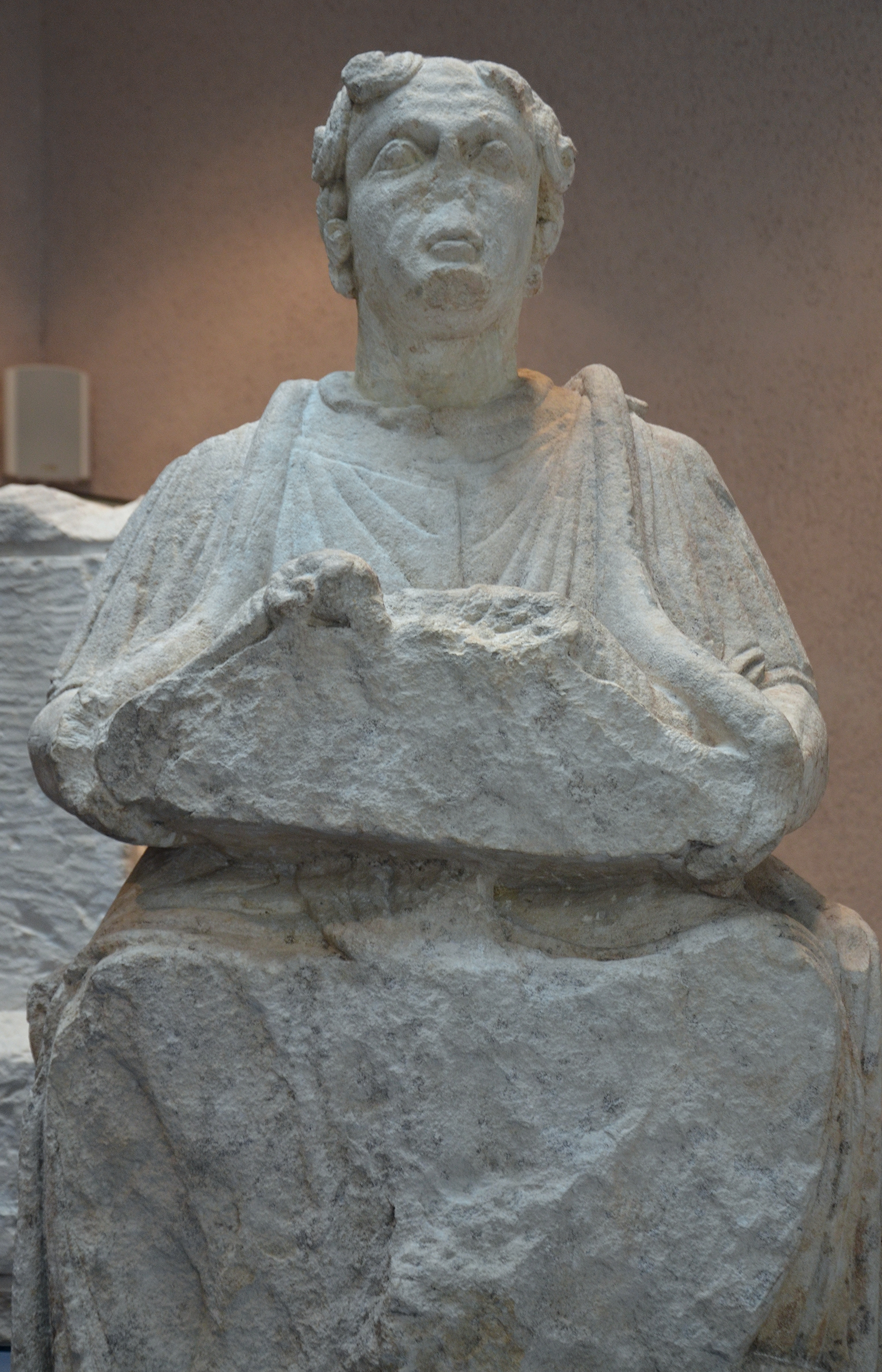
A Gallo-Roman statuette of Cernunnos from Sommerécourt, with horned serpents feeding from a bowl

The crossed legs, holes for the insertion of antlers, torcs, and ram-headed serpents are all characteristic of depictions of Cernunnos. The aged appearance of Cernunnos here has its best parallel in the famous Pillar of the Boatmen of Lutetia. A Gallo-Roman statue of Cernunnos found at Sommerécourt (Haute-Marne) similarly has the god feeding two horned serpents from a bowl in his hands.

The statuette is Gallo-Roman in date. Its casting shows the influence of classical sculpture. However, unlike much Gallo-Roman religious sculpture, which assimilated Gaulish gods with Graeco-Roman deities, this statuette seems to have "retained [its] Celtic individuality unimpaired". Art historian Phyllis Pray Bober sees a strong resemblance between the God of Étang-sur-Arroux and the God of Bouray (a bronze statuette perhaps also of Cernunnos) and has suggested that they are contemporary. This is of little help when it comes to further specifying the date of the God of Étang-sur-Arroux, as the dating of the God of Bouray is so uncertain.

The two (perhaps three) small faces around the statuette's head are a peculiarity. (Note: This feature is not, however, without parallels. A Gallo-Roman bronze head of a woman (8cm in height) discovered at Cebazat (Puy-de-Dôme) has two small faces applied above the ears. The head is perhaps intended to be the Roman goddess Diana, but Bober has suggested that it represents the female partner of Cernunnos as the head has two small holes (perhaps for antlers) behind its diadem.) However, three-faced or three-headed depictions of Cernunnos are not unknown. Examples of such depictions of Cernunnos are found at Les Bolards (Côte-d'Or), Langres (Haute-Marne), and Condat (Dordogne). Bober and David Fickett-Wilbar suggests that these represent the close relationship (or even assimilation) of Cernunnos with the tricephalic god known throughout Gallo-Roman art. Others demur. Paul-Marie Duval suggests that the tripling of faces on the God of Étang-sur-Arroux is merely intended to heighten the power of the deity, and perhaps to convey upon him omniscience. Hélène Chew suggests that these small faces "perhaps rather illustrate a mythological episode [involving Cernunnos] which is unknown to us". (Note: Original French: "peut-être illustrent-ils plutôt un épisode mythologique ignoré de nous".)

== See also ==
- God of Amiens
- Corleck Head
- Euffigneix statue
- Lyon cup
