= Horned Serpent =

Legendary serpent found in the mythology of many cultures

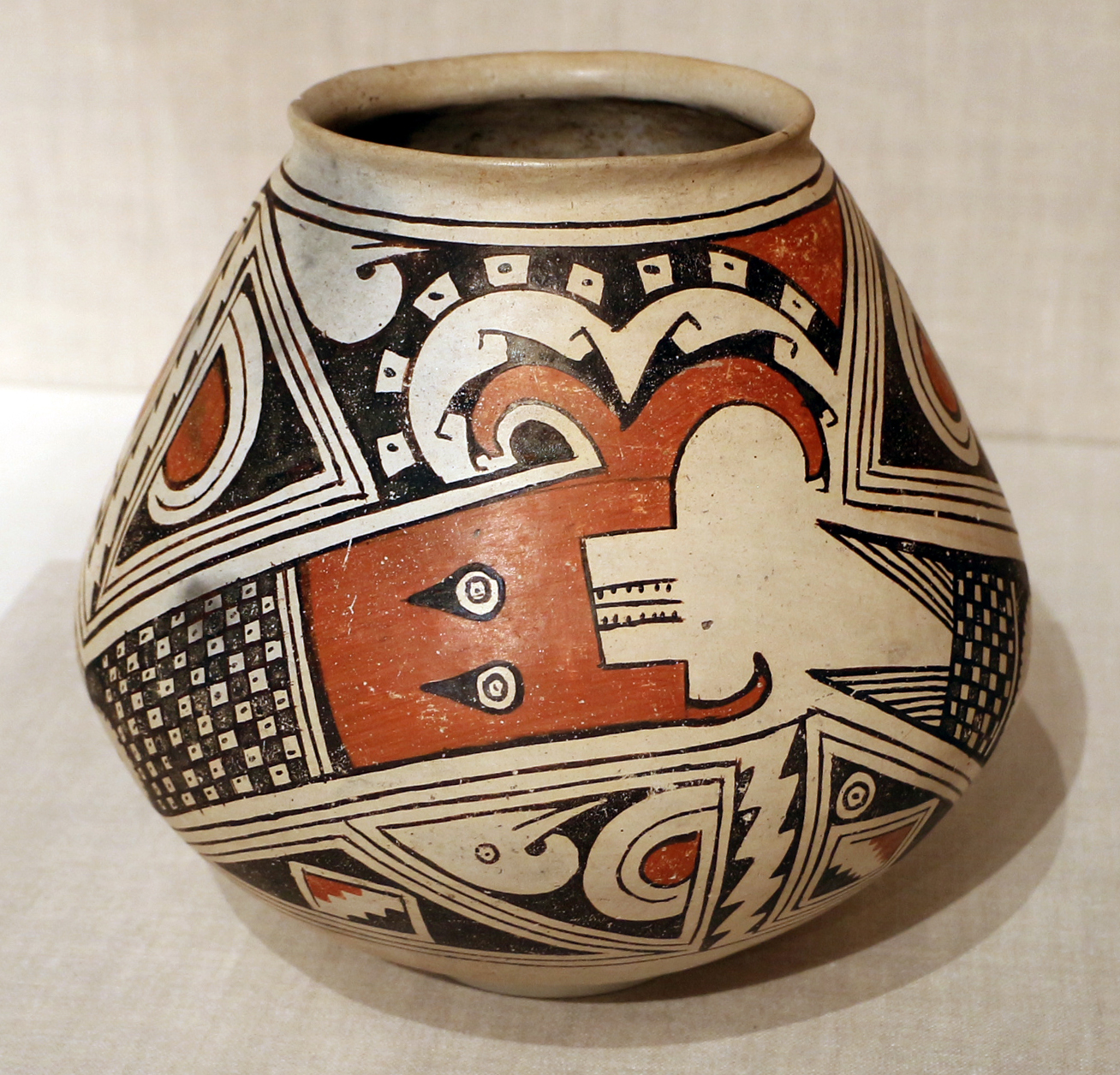
The Horned Serpent design is a common theme on pottery from Casas Grandes (Paquimé)

The Horned Serpent appears in the mythologies of many cultures including Native American peoples, European, and Near Eastern mythology. Details vary among cultures, with many of the stories associating the mystical figure with water, rain, lightning, thunder, and rebirth. Horned Serpents were major components of the Southeastern Ceremonial Complex of North American prehistory.

== In Native American cultures ==
Horned serpents appear in the oral history of numerous Native American cultures, especially in the Southeastern Woodlands and Great Lakes.

Muscogee traditions include a Horned Serpent and a Tie-Snake, estakwvnayv in the Muscogee language. These are sometimes interpreted as being the same creature and sometimes different—similar, but the Horned Serpent is larger than the Tie-Snake. To the Muscogee people, the Horned Serpent is a type of underwater serpent covered with iridescent, crystalline scales and a single, large crystal in its forehead. Both the scales and crystals are prized for their powers of divination. The horns, called chitto gab-by, were used in medicine. Jackson Lewis, a Muscogee informant to John R. Swanton, said, "This snake lives in the water has horns like the stag. It is not a bad snake. ... It does not harm human beings but seems to have a magnetic power over game." In stories, the Horned Serpent enjoyed eating sumac, Rhus glabra.

Alabama people call the Horned Serpent tcinto såktco or "crawfish snake", which they divide into four classifications based on its horns' colors, which can be blue, red, white, or yellow.

Yuchi people made effigies of the Horned Serpent as recently as 1905. An effigy was fashioned from stuffed deerhide, painted blue, with the antlers painted yellow. The Yuchi Big Turtle Dance honors the Horned Serpent's spirit, which was related to storms, thunder, lightning, disease, and rainbows.

Among Cherokee people, a Horned Serpent is called an uktena. Anthropologist James Mooney, describes the creature:

Those who know say the Uktena is a great snake, as large around as a tree trunk, with horns on its head, and a bright blazing crest like a diamond on its forehead, and scales glowing like sparks of fire. It has rings or spots of color along its whole length, and can not be wounded except by shooting in the seventh spot from the head, because under this spot are its heart and its life. The blazing diamond is called Ulun'suti—"Transparent"—and he who can win it may become the greatest wonder worker of the tribe. But it is worth a man's life to attempt it, for whoever is seen by the Uktena is so dazed by the bright light that he runs toward the snake instead of trying to escape. As if this were not enough, the breath of the Uktena is so pestilential, that no living creature can survive should they inhale the tiniest bit of the foul air expelled by the Uktena. Even to see the Uktena asleep is death, not to the hunter himself, but to his family.

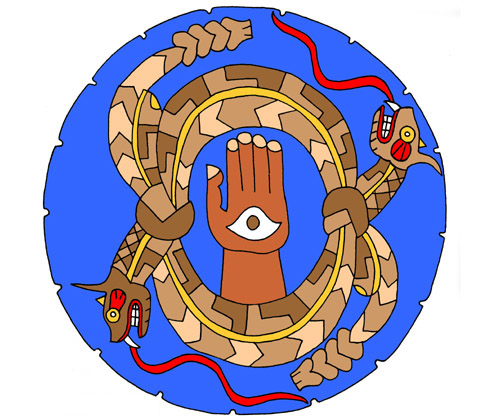
Tie-snakes on a Mississippian sandstone plate from the Moundville Archaeological Site

According to Sioux belief, the Unhcegila (Ųȟcéǧila) are dangerous reptilian water monsters which lived in ancient times. They were of various shapes. In the end the Thunderbirds destroyed them, except for small species like snakes and lizards. This belief may have been inspired by finds of dinosaur fossils in Sioux tribal territory. The Thunderbird may have been inspired partly by finds of pterosaur skeletons.

=== Other known names ===
- Sisiutl— Kwakwaka'wakw
- Awanyu—Tewa
- Djodi'kwado'—Haudenosaunee
- Misi-kinepikw ("great snake")—Cree
- Msi-kinepikwa ("great snake")—Shawnee
- Misi-ginebig ("great snake")—Oji-Cree
- Mishi-ginebig ("great snake")—Ojibwe
- Gitaskog ("great snake")—Abenaki
- Sintishtahollo' ("sacred snake")—Chickasaw
- Sinti Lapitta—Choctaw
- Unktehi or Unktehila—Dakota
- ʔU·lahkaha·p ("white snake")—Natchez
- Uktena—Cherokee
- mazacoatl - Nahuatl

== Eurasia ==
=== In Europe ===
==== In Celtic iconography ====
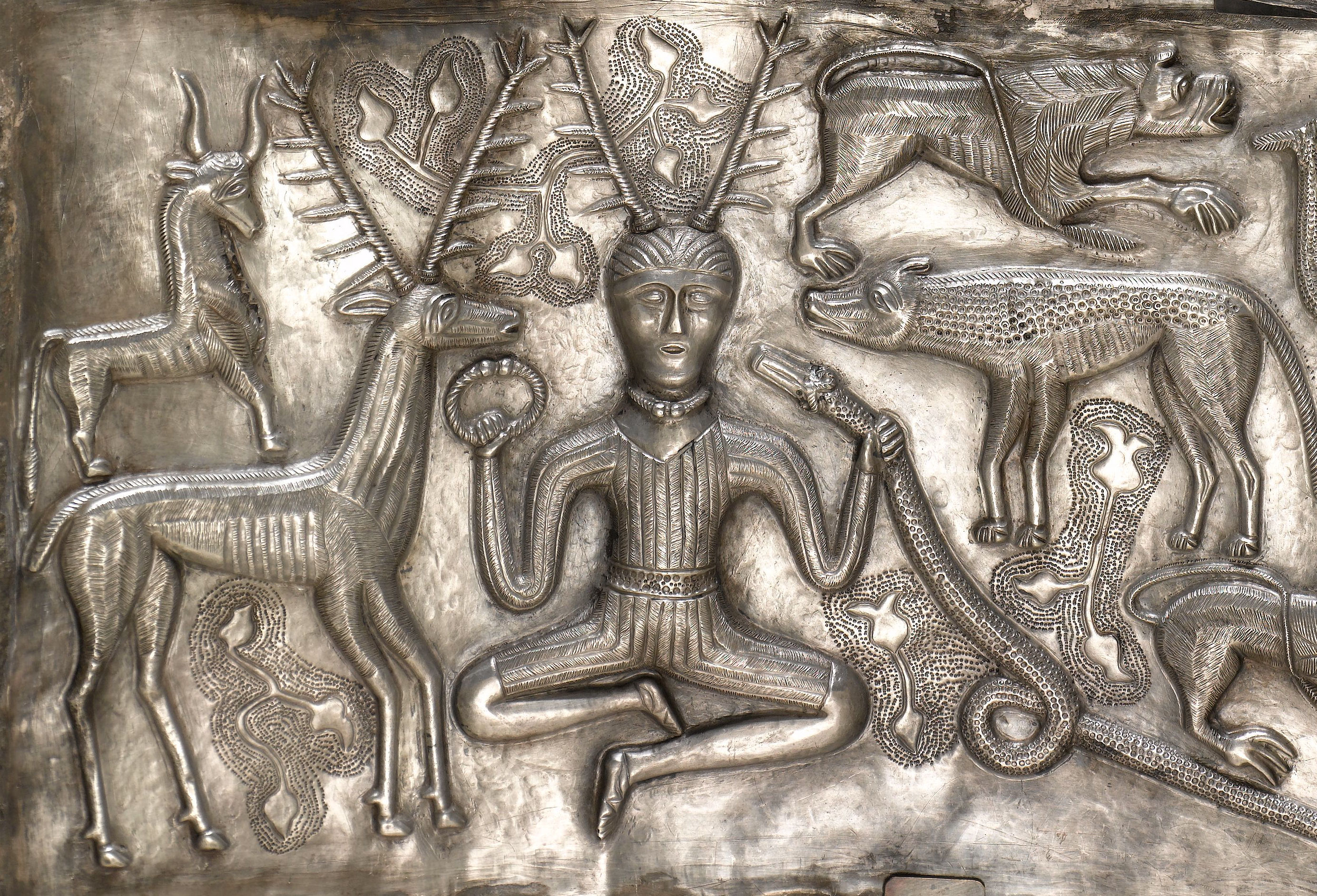
The antlered deity of the Gundestrup cauldron, commonly identified with Cernunnos, holding a ram-horned serpent and a torc.

The ram-horned serpent was a cult image found in north-west Europe before and during the Roman period. It appears three times on the Gundestrup cauldron, and in Romano-Celtic Gaul was closely associated with the horned or antlered god Cernunnos, in whose company it is regularly depicted. This pairing is found as early as the fourth century BC in Northern Italy, where a huge antlered figure with torcs and a serpent was carved on the rocks in Val Camonica.

A bronze statuette called the God of Étang-sur-Arroux and a stone sculpture from Sommerécourt depict Cernunnos' body encircled by two horned snakes which feed from bowls of fruit and corn-mash balanced in the god's lap. Also at Sommerécourt is a sculpture of a goddess holding a cornucopia and a pomegranate, with a horned serpent eating from a bowl of food. At Yzeures-sur-Creuse a carved youth has a ram-horned snake twined around his legs, with its head at his stomach. In a relief at a museum in Cirencester, Gloucestershire, Cernunnos' legs are depicted as two ram-horned snakes which rear up on each side of his head and are eating fruit or corn.

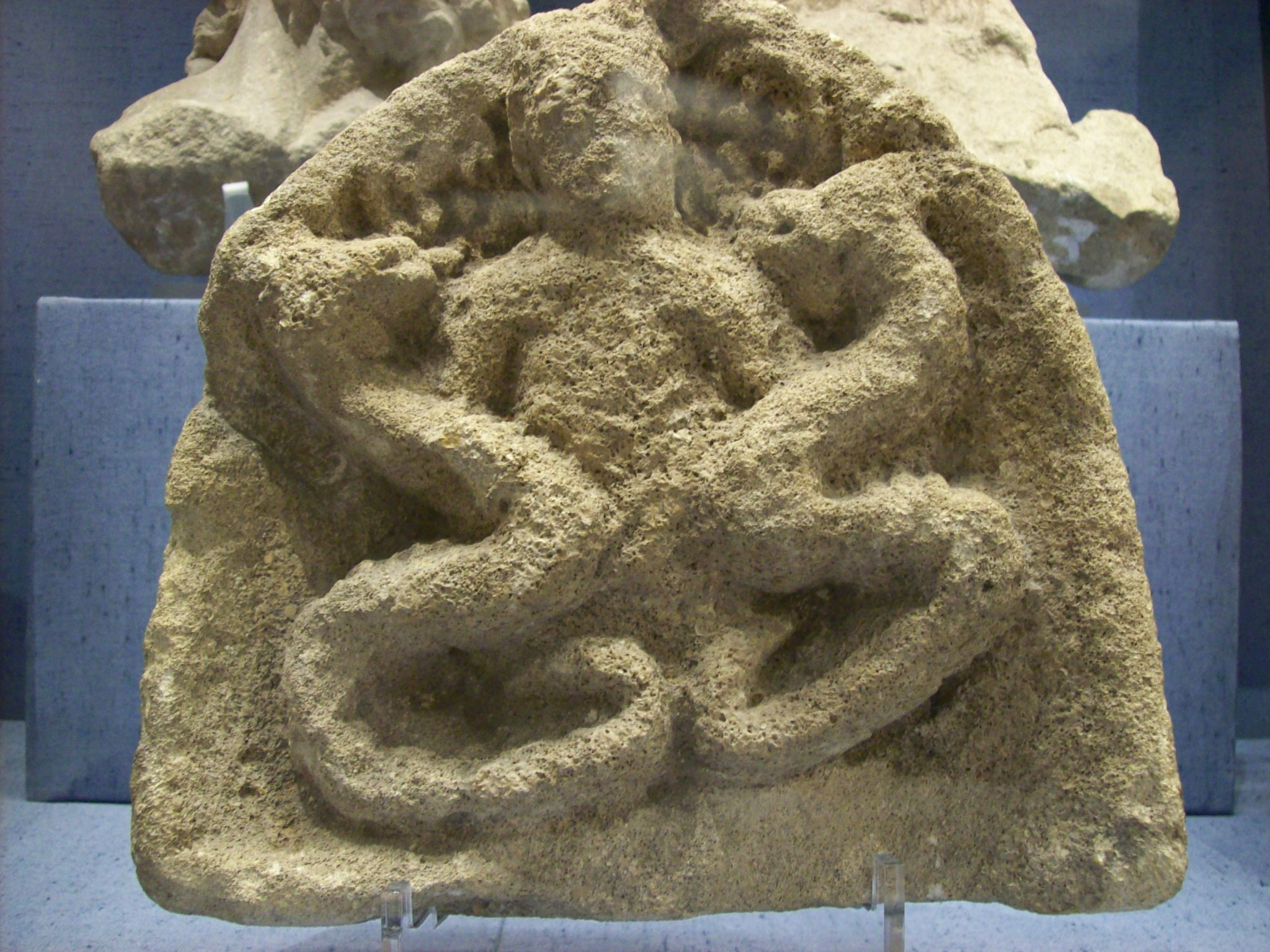
Relief of Cernunnos with two ram-horned snakes in the Corinium Museum.

According to Miranda Green, the snakes reflect the peaceful nature of the god, associated with nature and fruitfulness, and perhaps accentuate his association with regeneration.

Other deities occasionally accompanied by ram-horned serpents include "Celtic Mars" and "Celtic Mercury". The horned snake, and also conventional snakes, appear together with the solar wheel, apparently as attributes of the sun or sky god.

==== In Northern and Central Europe ====
Variations on the horned serpent appear throughout the folklores of Northern and Central Europe. For example, there are the many incarnations of the Lindworm. There are tales of a serpent in Icelandic folklore known as the Lagarfljót Worm. While in Southern Sweden, there are claims of a huge water snake, the sight of which was deadly, called Storsjöodjuret. This latter characteristic is reminiscent of the basilisk.

==== Greek ====
The cerastes is a creature described in Greek mythology as a snake with either two large ram-like horns or four pairs of smaller horns. Isidore of Seville described it as hunting by burying itself in sand while leaving its horns visible, and attacking creatures that came to investigate them.

=== In Mesopotamia ===
In Mesopotamian mythology, Ningishzida is sometimes depicted as a serpent with horns. In other depictions, he is shown as human but is accompanied by bashmu, mushussu, and ushumgal (three horned snakes in Akkadian mythology). Ningishzida shares the epithet, ushumgal, "great serpent", with several other Mesopotamian gods.

== In Africa ==
A horned serpent cave art is known from the La Belle France cave in South Africa, often conflated with the Dingonek. It may be based on dicynodont fossils.

== See also ==
- Amaru
- Avanyu
- Basilisk
- Chinese dragon
  - Qiulong
- Coi Coi-Vilu
- Feathered Serpent (deity)
- Horned deity
- Kitchi-at'Husis and Weewilmekq
- Kukulcan
- Lernaean Hydra
- Lindworm
- Moñái
- Nāga
- Ophiotaurus
- Quetzalcoatl
- Piasa Bird, Alton, Illinois
- Prehistoric snakes
- Python (mythology)
- Sea goat
- Sidewinder rattlesnake of the American Southwest, a living "horned serpent"
- Tciptckaam
- Titanoboa
