= Moses and the Tablets of the Law =

Painting by Philippe de Champaigne

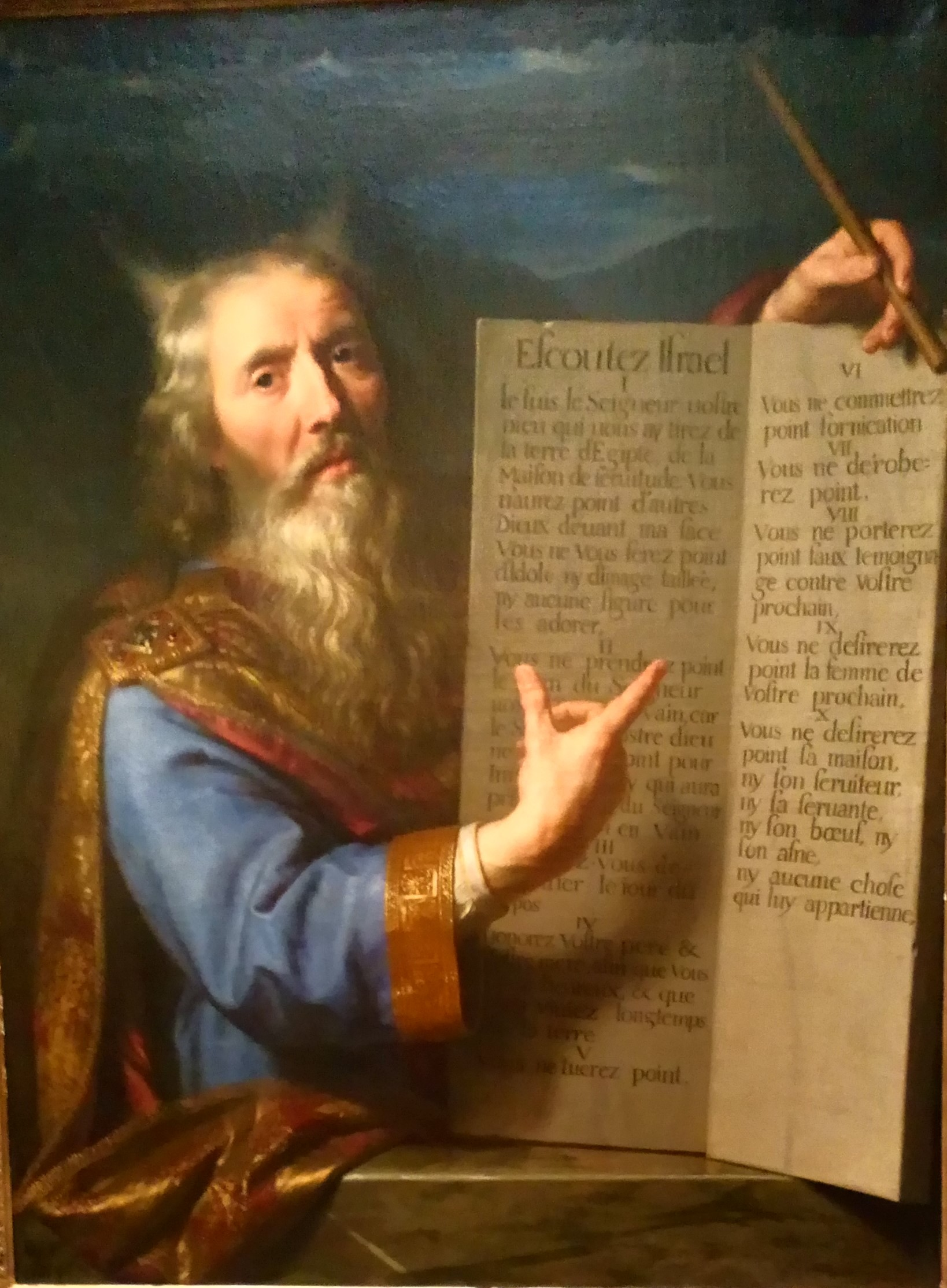
Moses and the Tablets of the Law (1663) by Philippe de Champaigne

Moses and the Tablets of the Law is a 1663 oil on canvas painting by Philippe de Champaigne, now in the Musée de Picardie in Amiens, to which it was given in 1922 by Alexis Marie François de Boutray. He painted it whilst in the service of Marie de Médicis and cardinal de Richelieu and it shows his training in the Flemish school, with the addition of balance showing the influence of French academic art.

He also produced a work showing Moses presenting the Tablets of the Law in 1648, now in Milwaukee Art Museum.
