= Priapus of Rivery =

Bronze statuette dating from the 1st century, found in Rivery

Priapus of Rivery Priape de Rivery
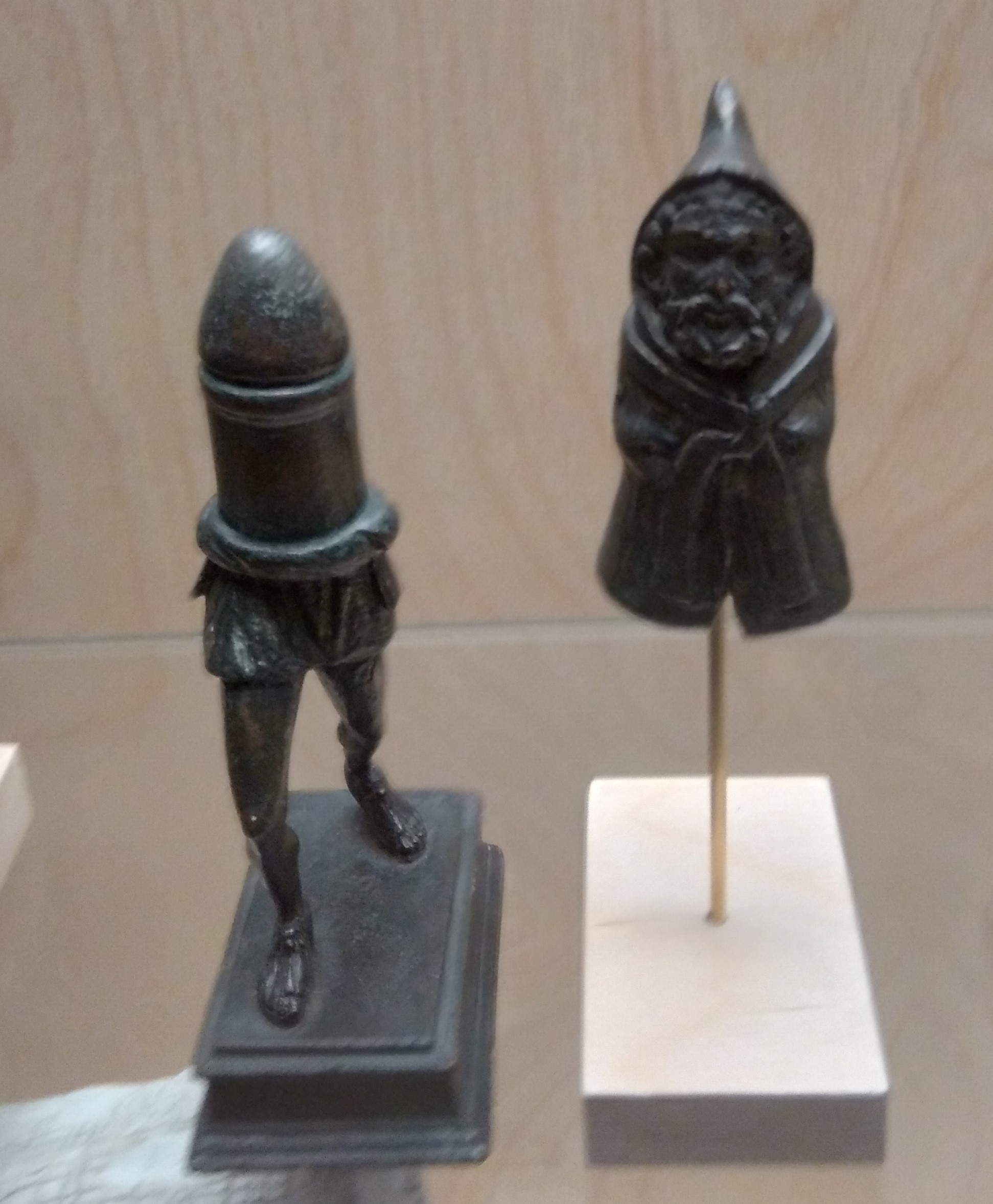
- Priapus of Rivery discovered in 1771 CE.
- Type: Statuettes
- Material: bronze
- Size: 18 x 9.2 cm
- Period/culture: Antiquity
- Discovered: 1771 CE; Rivery
- Present location: Musée de Picardie in Amiens
- Coordinates: 40.7128°N 74.0060°W
- Registration: M.P.1876.477
- Culture: Roman Empire (1st century)

The Priapus of Rivery is a bronze statuette dating from the 1st century, found in Rivery, in the Somme department, on the eastern edge of the city of Amiens in France. It is kept at the Musée de Picardie.

== History ==
The Priapus of Rivery was discovered in 1771 CE in a tomb filled with ceramics and glassware. It appears that this tomb was that of an important figure of the time. The statuette was kept at the Hôtel de Ville, Amiens until 1864 CE. Today, it is one of the oldest pieces in the Musée de Picardie. It dates from the 1st century CE.

== Features ==
The bronze statuette measures 18 cm high, 9.2 cm long, 5.3 cm wide and rests on a quadrangular base. It represents a walking figure, bearded, with curly hair, wearing a cucullus, a very short Gallic cloak, a sort of cape with a hood, worn by both men and women. He also wears a short tunic revealing his bare thighs and legs, and caligae, a type of sandal with wooden soles.

The uniqueness of the statuette lies in the fact that it is composed of two removable parts: the head and the cucullus which forms a lid covering a phallus.

It is therefore Priapus, ithyphallic deity of antiquity, god of fertility, fecundity, protector of gardens and the countryside, whose cult was very widespread in the Roman world.

What is remarkable about this object is its plastic quality and its originality. Traces of gilding were found on the statuette.

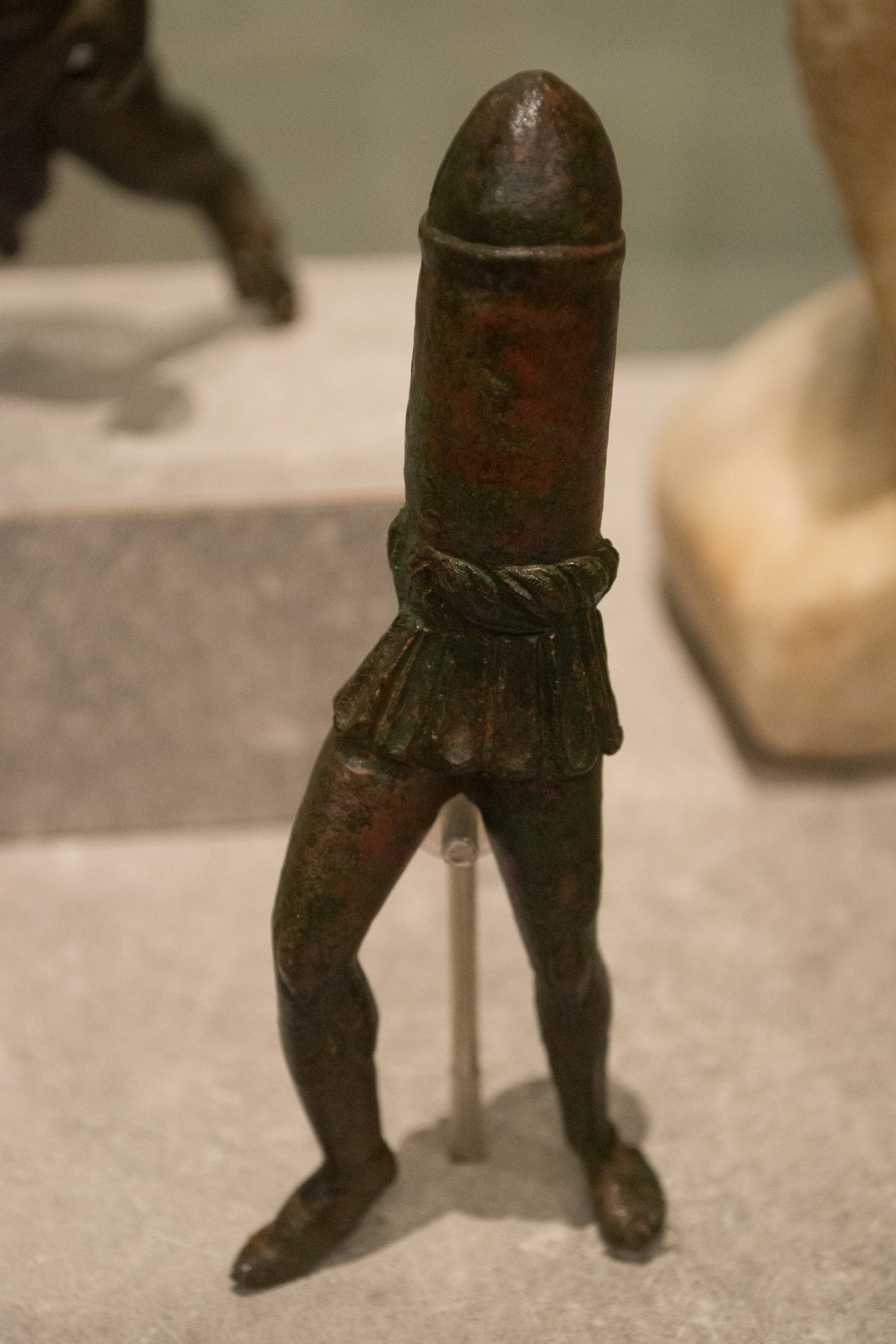
Similar bronze statue in the Archaeology Museum of Catalonia in Girona, inventory number 746, c. 1st-2nd century CE

A similar bronze statuette was found in Jerez de los Caballeros in Badajoz, Spain and is now in the Archaeology Museum of Catalonia in Girona, inventory number 746.

== See also ==
- Samarobriva
- History of Amiens
- Musée de Picardie

== Bibliography ==
- Foucart, Jacques (1978). "Les circonstances de la découverte en 1771 du Priape en bronze du Musée de Picardie". Revue archéologique de Picardie. 5 (1): 289–290. doi:10.3406/pica.1978.1277.
- Foucart, Jacques (1987). "Note sur le Priape du Musée de Picardie découvert à Rivery en 1771 : verroterie ou diamant ?". Revue archéologique de Picardie. 3 (1): 61–63. doi:10.3406/pica.1987.1522.
