= Lantilly =

- Commune
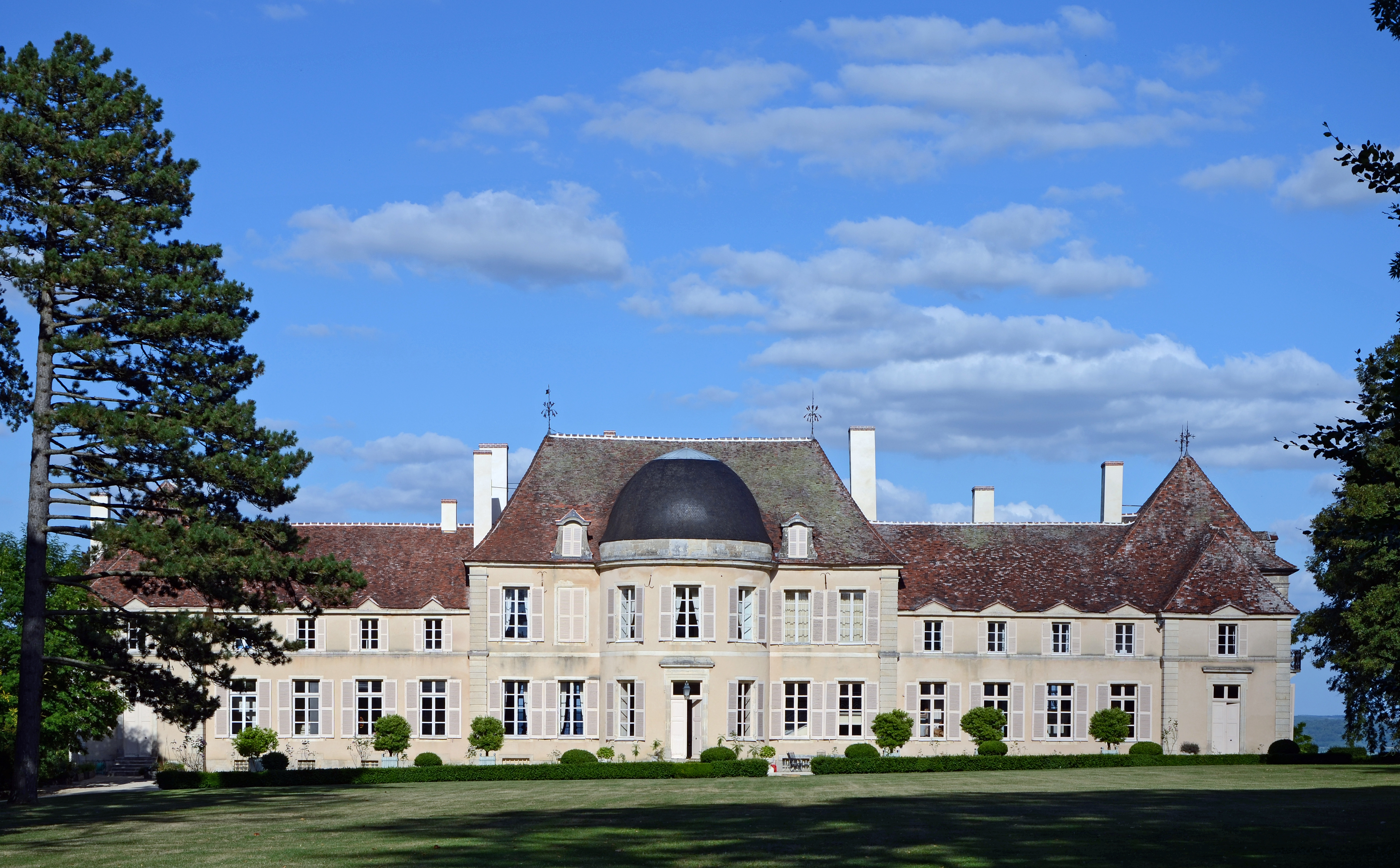
- Chateau
- Location of Lantilly
- Location within France Location within Bourgogne-Franche-Comté
- Coordinates: 47°32′41″N 4°22′42″E
- Country: France
- Region: Bourgogne-Franche-Comté
- Department: Côte-d'Or
- Arrondissement: Montbard
- Canton: Semur-en-Auxois

Government
  - Mayor (2020–2026): Nathalie Quincey
- Area^{1}: 9.26 km^{2} (3.58 sq mi)
- Elevation: 390 m (1,280 ft)
- Highest elevation: 395 m (1,296 ft)
- Lowest elevation: 240 m (790 ft)
- Population (2023): 97
  - Density: 10/km^{2} (27/sq mi)
- Time zone: UTC+01:00 (CET)
  - Summer (DST): UTC+02:00 (CEST)
- INSEE/Postal code: 21341 /21140
- ^{1} French Land Register data, which excludes lakes, ponds, glaciers > 1 km^{2} (0.386 sq mi or 247 acres) and river estuaries.

Lantilly is a commune in the Côte-d'Or department in eastern France.

The Gallo-Roman stone statuette called the God of Lantilly was found in the cemetery of the local church here.

== Population ==
Historical population
Year	Pop.	±% p.a.
1968	91	—
1975	86	−0.80%
1982	92	+0.97%
1990	112	+2.49%
1999	94	−1.93%
2007	96	+0.26%
2012	105	+1.81%
2017	109	+0.75%
2023	97	−1.93%
Source: INSEE

== See also ==
- Communes of the Côte-d'Or department
