= Étang-sur-Arroux =

- Commune
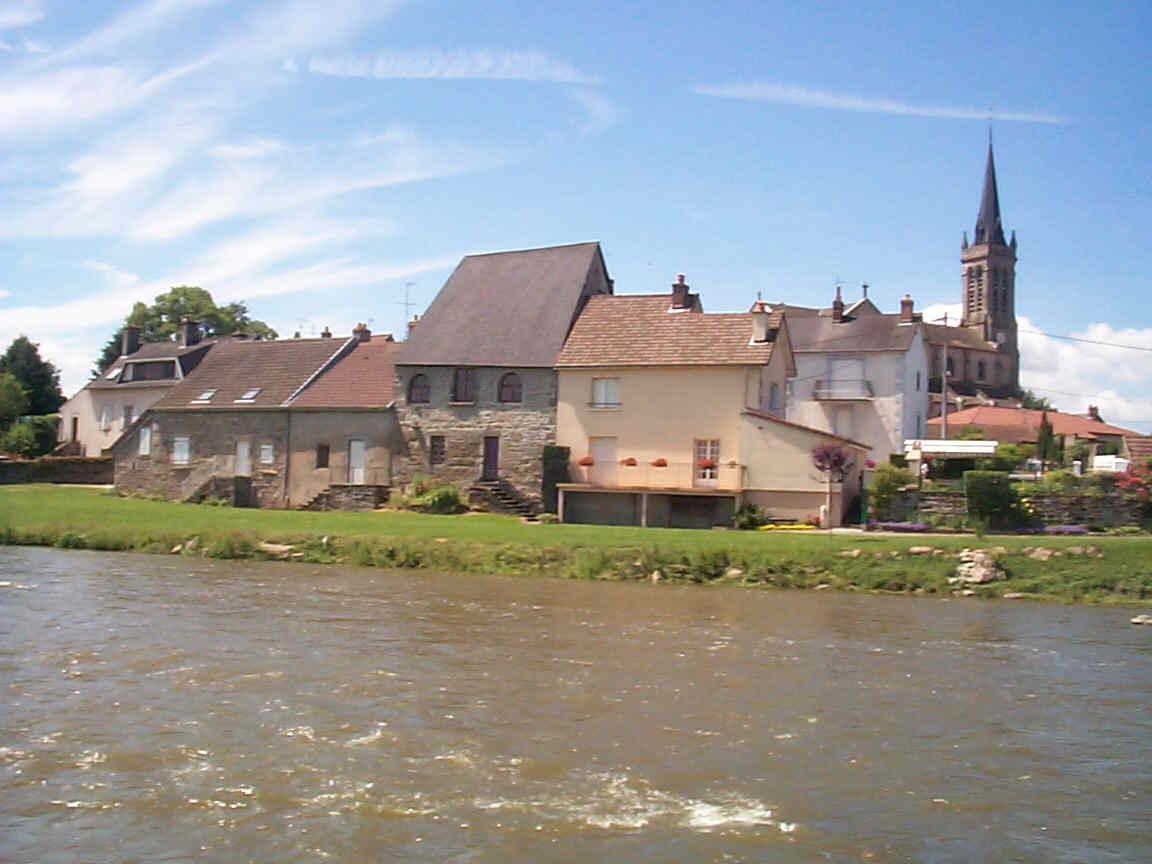
- The church and surroundings in Étang-sur-Arroux

- Coat of arms
- Location of Étang-sur-Arroux
- Location within France Location within Bourgogne-Franche-Comté
- Coordinates: 46°52′01″N 4°11′25″E
- Country: France
- Region: Bourgogne-Franche-Comté
- Department: Saône-et-Loire
- Arrondissement: Autun
- Canton: Autun-2
- Area^{1}: 34.63 km^{2} (13.37 sq mi)
- Elevation: 277 m (909 ft)
- Highest elevation: 433 m (1,421 ft)
- Lowest elevation: 266 m (873 ft)
- Population (2023): 1,750
  - Density: 50.5/km^{2} (131/sq mi)
- Time zone: UTC+01:00 (CET)
  - Summer (DST): UTC+02:00 (CEST)
- INSEE/Postal code: 71192 /71190
- ^{1} French Land Register data, which excludes lakes, ponds, glaciers > 1 km^{2} (0.386 sq mi or 247 acres) and river estuaries.

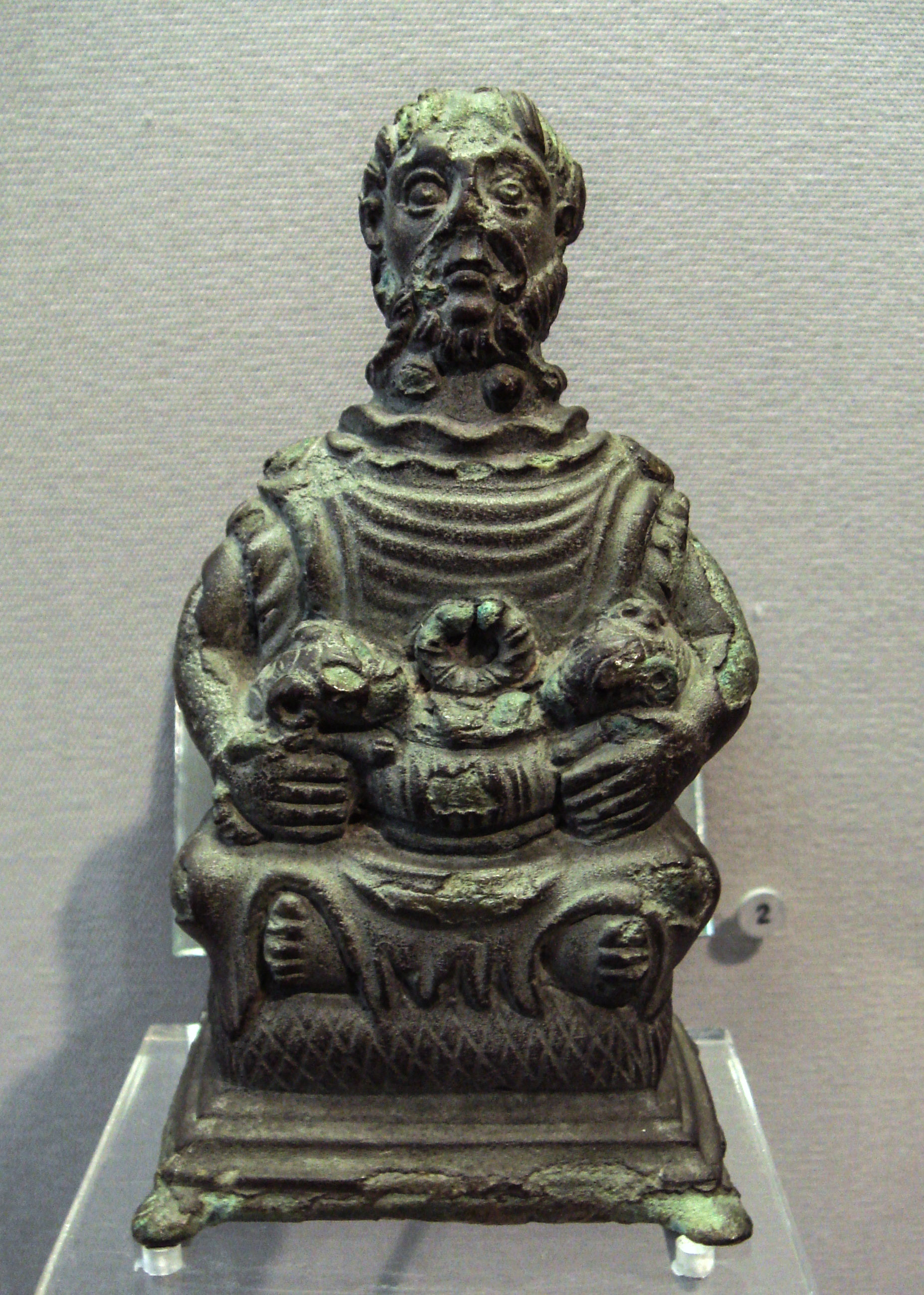
God of Étang-sur-Arroux, a possible depiction of Cernunnos

Étang-sur-Arroux (French pronunciation: [etɑ̃ syʁ aʁu], literally Étang on Arroux) is a commune in the Saône-et-Loire department in the region of Bourgogne-Franche-Comté in eastern France. The bronze statuette called the God of Étang-sur-Arroux was found here.

== See also ==
- Communes of the Saône-et-Loire department
- Parc naturel régional du Morvan
