= Rivery =

- Commune
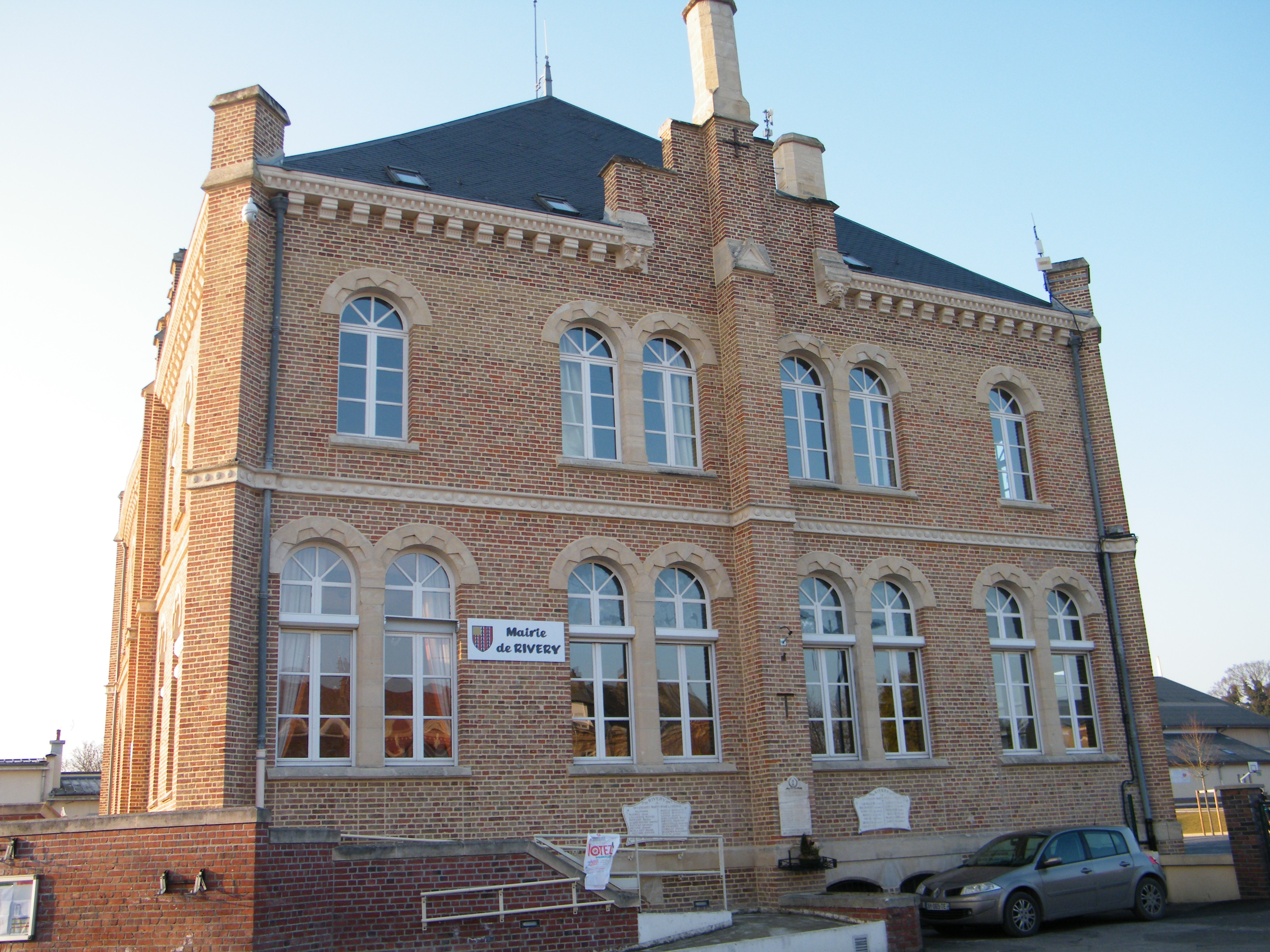
- The town hall in Rivery

- Coat of arms
- Location of Rivery
- Location within France Location within Hauts-de-France
- Coordinates: 49°54′13″N 2°19′40″E
- Country: France
- Region: Hauts-de-France
- Department: Somme
- Arrondissement: Amiens
- Canton: Amiens-3
- Intercommunality: Amiens Métropole

Government
  - Mayor (2020–2026): Bernard Bocquillon
- Area^{1}: 6.37 km^{2} (2.46 sq mi)
- Elevation: 25 m (82 ft)
- Highest elevation: 76 m (249 ft)
- Lowest elevation: 22 m (72 ft)
- Population (2023): 3,636
  - Density: 571/km^{2} (1,480/sq mi)
- Time zone: UTC+01:00 (CET)
  - Summer (DST): UTC+02:00 (CEST)
- INSEE/Postal code: 80674 /80136
- ^{1} French Land Register data, which excludes lakes, ponds, glaciers > 1 km^{2} (0.386 sq mi or 247 acres) and river estuaries.

Rivery (French pronunciation: [ʁivʁi]) is a commune in the Somme department in Hauts-de-France in northern France.

== Geography ==
Rivery is situated on the north-eastern outskirts of Amiens, on the other side of the Somme River and on the D1 road. The area is known for its market gardens, or hortillons, small patches of cultivated land between the drainage channels that prevent the area returning to marsh.

== Population ==
Historical population

Year	Pop.	±% p.a.
1926	883	—
1931	1,165	+5.70%
1936	1,301	+2.23%
1946	1,506	+1.47%
1954	1,581	+0.61%
1962	2,680	+6.82%
1968	3,411	+4.10%
1975	3,402	−0.04%

Year	Pop.	±% p.a.
1982	3,287	−0.49%
1990	3,366	+0.30%
1999	3,400	+0.11%
2007	3,378	−0.08%
2012	3,428	+0.29%
2017	3,552	+0.71%
2023	3,636	+0.39%

Source: EHESS and INSEE

== See also ==
- Communes of the Somme department
- Priapus of Rivery
