= Jules Roulleau =

French sculptor

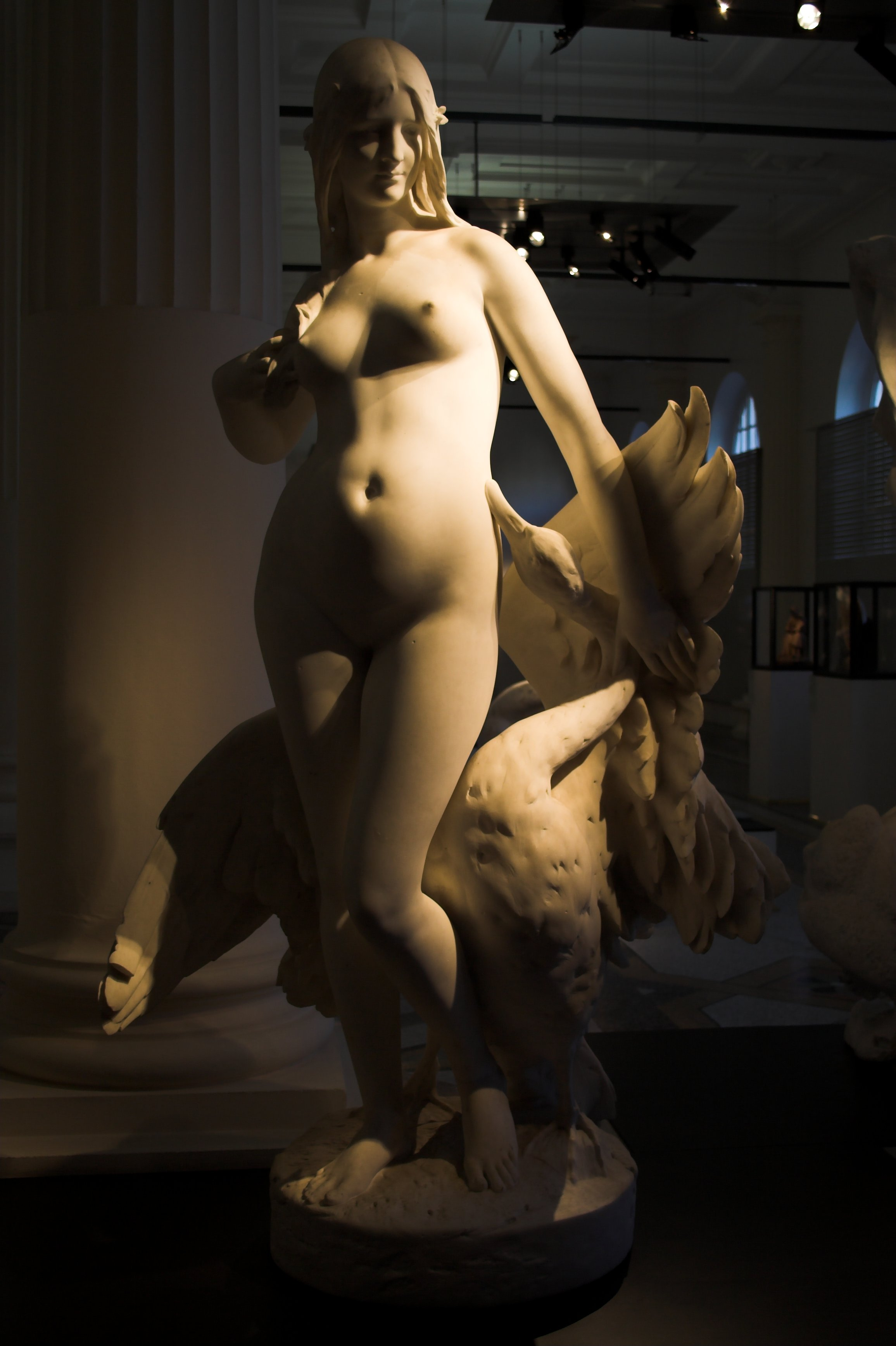
Leda and the swan by Jules Roulleau (Musée de Picardie)

Jules Pierre Roulleau (1855, Libourne – 1895, Paris) was a French sculptor. He produced a monumental sculpture of Joan of Arc at Chinon. His other sculptures include Lazare Carnot at Nolay, Théodore de Banville in the Jardin du Luxembourg in Paris and Nicolas Appert (1893) at the Musée des Beaux-Arts de Châlons-en-Champagne.
