= God of Amiens =

Statue of a Gallo-Roman god in France

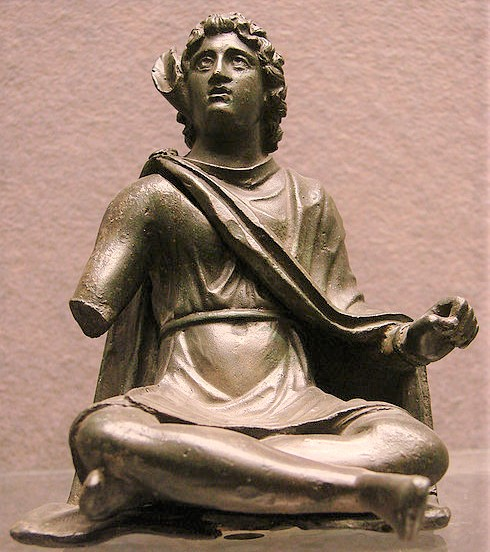
The God of Amiens

The God of Amiens is a Gallo-Roman bronze statuette found in Amiens, Somme. The statuette, which has been dated to the end of the 1st century CE, is of a male youth sat cross-legged, with the right ear of an animal, perhaps a deer's. This statuette is on display at the Musée de Picardie.

The God of Amiens has been linked iconographically with two other Gallo-Roman statues from northeastern France, the God of Besançon and God of Lantilly. These have been thought to represent a common Gaulish god, whose attributes included a bunch of grapes, a serpent, and an animal ear. This god is perhaps connected with the Celtic stag god Cernunnos.

== Discovery and later history ==
The statuette was found in October 1845 in the faubourg of Saint-Fuscien, in the Henriville neighbourhood of Amiens, on the property of one Captain Bournel. It was found alongside Roman coins and a bronze spoon. Saint-Fuscien appears to have been a necropolis in ancient times, as evidence of several burials and cremations have been found in the area. A Roman tegula was reportedly also found at the same property.

Bournel donated the statuette to the Musée de Picardie. The antiquarian Marcel Jérôme Rigollot reported this find in an article for the Mémoires de la Société des Antiquaires de Picardie in 1846. It was restored in 1987 by M.-E. Meyohas and P. Chantriaux.

== Description ==
The statuette is 12 cm (4.7 in) tall and 8.5 cm (3.3 in) wide. It is made of two cast bronze pieces: the left arm, head, and cloak belong to one; while the right arm, torso, and legs belong to the other. The statue has been dated to the end of the 1st century CE, during the Roman occupation of Gaul.

The statuette is of a young man seated cross-legged. He has a tunic clasped to his torso by a belt, and a cloak (a sagum) fastened to his right shoulder. He is wearing shoes, of which only the soles are rendered. His right arm is amputated at the forearm. His left arm has survived in its entirety, but the hand is in a hollow fist, as if clutching a (now missing) object. His head is 29 mm (1.1 in) in height. His face is beardless. His hair is voluminous and curly. His facial features, particularly his eyes, are rendered rather heavily. He gazes upward. His right ear, emerging from the curly hair, is elongated (19 mm (0.75 in) in length) and cornet-shaped. Only the lobe of his left ear is visible under his hair.

== A Gaulish god with one animal ear? ==
=== Parallels ===
When Rigollot announced the find, he complained that a second statue of this type could not be found. (Note: Rigollot: "objet si rare en archéologie, qu'il serait peut-être difficile d'en citer un second exemple".) However, the statue has since been closely linked with two other Gallo-Roman statues, both also discovered in northeastern France. These represent a type, with the characteristic attributes of an elongated right animal ear, a bunch of grapes, and a serpent.

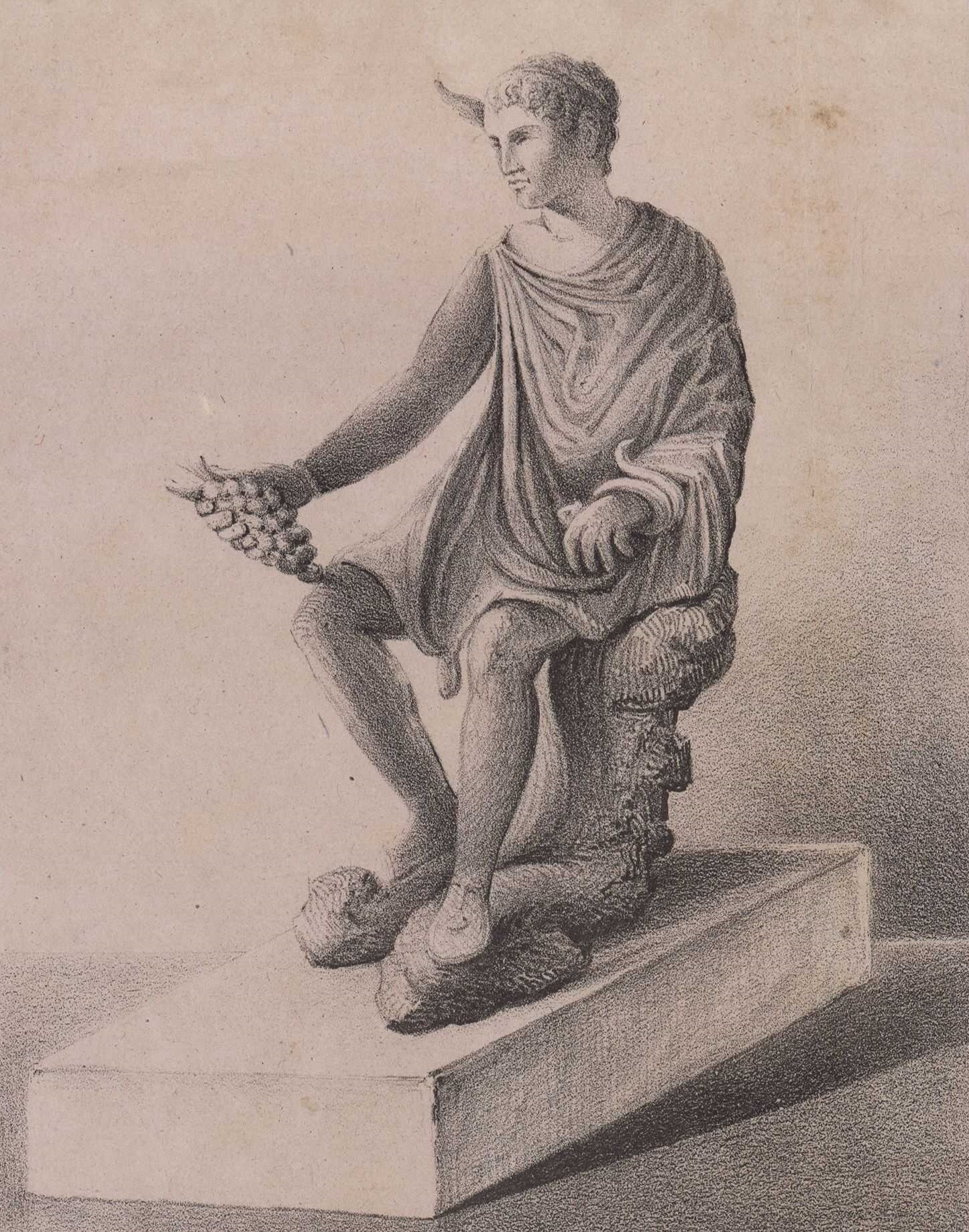
Lithograph of the God of Besançon

First, a small (12 cm / 5 in tall) bronze statuette of a seated god from Besançon. (Note: Found in 1849 in Besançon during construction on a new aqueduct along Rue Pasteur. The statuette is now at the Museum of Besançon. It was previously deemed (by Auguste Castan) to be an allegorical representation of temperance opposed to drunkenness.) The statuette is of a male youth seated upon a rock. The youth wears a belted tunic and chlamys. On his legs are tight breeches and on his feet are sandals. His right arm is projected outwards and in his right hand he holds a bunch of grapes against his right knee. Around the left hand, a serpent is coiled (whose head and tail are missing). The figure has a small, beardless head and a peculiarly long and wide neck. By contrast to the Amiens statuette, his hair is rather flat and his gaze is lowered. His right ear is elongated and very pointed. Unlike the Amiens statuette, the human left ear is fully visible.

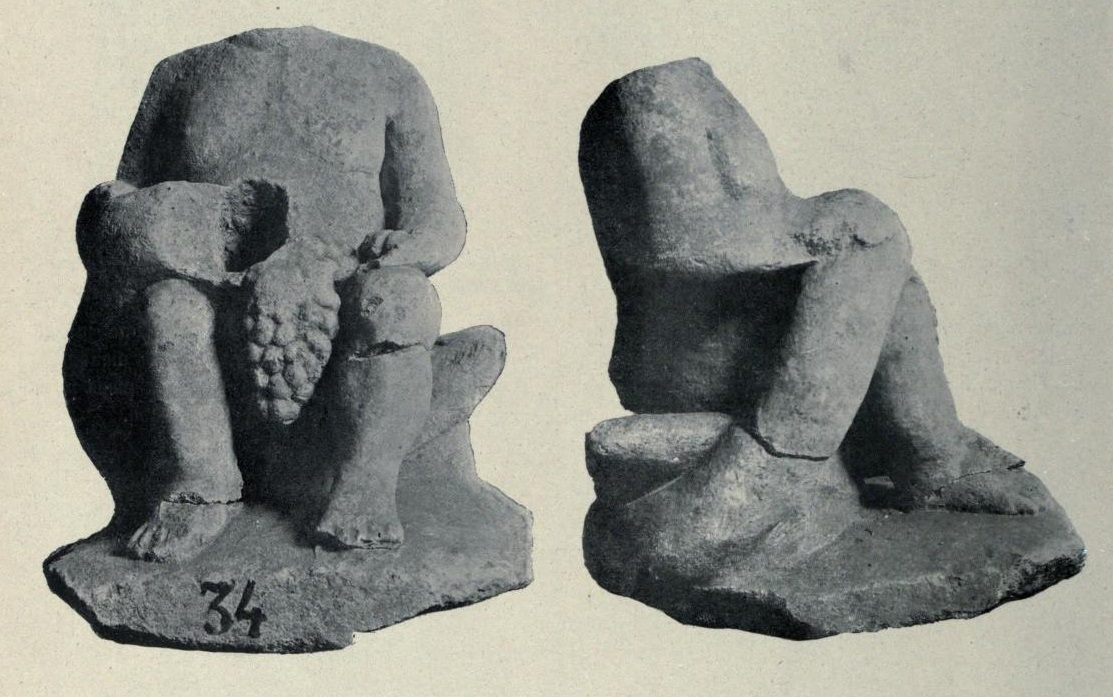
The God of Lantilly

Second, a medium-sized (45 cm / 18 in tall) stone statue from Lantilly. (Note: Found in 1878 in Lantilly during stonework in the cemetery of the local church. It is now at the Musée Rolin.) The statue is of a nude human figure seated on a low seat. A large bunch of grapes sit between his knees. His left hand is placed on his thigh; his right hand, badly broken, seems to have held a serpent. The serpent coils around the seat and has a tail like that of a fish. Missing are the head of the serpent and, frustratingly, the head of the human figure. (Note: Pierre Lambrechts has compared the God of Lantilly to the tricephalic bronze statuette called the God of Étang-sur-Arroux (which is perhaps a depiction of Cernunnos). This statue has two serpents, each with fish tails and ram heads. Lambrechts has therefore conjectured that the God of Lantilly's serpent had a ram head too.) A rectangular opening (8 by 5 cm (3.1 by 2.0 in)) has been carved in this figure's stomach, presumably intended to hold some object.

On the basis of these statues, Lucien Lerat has reconstructed the missing features of the Amiens statuette. In his left hand, where a hole shows something was once grasped, he held the body of a serpent; in his right hand (entirely missing), he held a bunch of grapes.

=== Interpretation ===
Rigollot identified the Amiens statue as a representation of Midas (portrayed, mythologically, with the ears of a donkey), but this interpretation has not been sustained. The crossed legs, association with the animal world, and heavy facial features allow the Amiens statuette to be identified as a Celtic representation of a god. (Note: One dissenter from this position is Fernand Benoit, who argues that a Celtic deity would be unlikely to have such monstrous and asymmetrical attributes. Waldemar Deonna argues that these objections are unfounded, since various deities in Celtic religion (such as the tricephalic god) could equally be considered monstrous.) The attributes are not identifiable with those of any god in the Greco-Roman pantheon, so these three statues have been thought to represent a common Gaulish god.

The God of Amiens has been thought to most closely approach a native Gaulish representation of this god. The Besançon statuette shows heavy Greco-Roman influence (for example, in the rock seat, and the naturalistic treatment of the god's head). The treatment of the chlamys seems borrowed from representations of Hermes. The clumsy treatment of the attire on the Amiens god, by contrast, is much more characteristic of Gaulish art. The Lantilly and Besançon gods are seated, whereas the Amiens god sits in the typical crossed legs of Celtic gods. The nudity of the Lantilly god is a peculiarity; the Besançon and Amiens gods are both clothed.

==== Meaning of the attributes ====
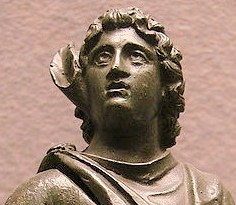
Detail of the ear of the God of Amiens

Each individual attribute is not without parallels. A small, grotesque Gallo-Roman bronze head (Note: Illustrated in Deonna, "Tête caricaturale", figs. 1-3. It is now at the Musée d'Art et d'Histoire, Geneva.) has two animal ears, one pointed up and one pointed down. Waldemar Deonna interprets the ear as that of a deer, and thus connects it with the God of Amiens. However, Stéphanie Boucher thinks that its grotesque quality disqualifies it from religious interpretation. Fernand Benoit has connected the snake and grape attributes with two bronze statuettes of Epona (one found in Reims, (Note: Illustrated in Magnen 1953, pl. 8. It is now at the Cabinet des Médailles.) the other in Maaseik (Note: Illustrated in Magnen 1953, pl. 5. It is now at the Art & History Museum, Brussels.)). Epona was a female Gallo-Roman god, revered as the protector of horses. Both are of Epona sidesaddle with a bunch of grapes in her right hand. Only the Reims statue has a (fragmentary) serpent in its left hand; the attribute in the Maaseik statue's left hand is now missing. Neither have any indication of an animal ear.

However, the meaning of the attributes is far from clear. The animal attribute is typical insofar as Celtic gods often link divinity with the natural world. Deonna has suggested the god's animal ear arose from the anthropomorphisation of a prior animal god, though Simone Deyts has tempered this by noting that we have no evidence of any such historical process taking place. Deonna has also drawn on comparative evidence from Celtic as well as Christian contexts to argue that the statues are intended to represent a god whose animal ear allows him to hear the supplications of his worshippers. Benoit has pointed out that these attributes could express a number of conceptual oppositions: the (mortal) human ear against the (divine) deer's ear; the deer (good) against the serpent (evil); the grape and animal ear (drunkenness) against the serpent (prudence).

This anomalous ear on the Amiens statuette is most commonly identified as a deer's ear, (Note: Raymond Lantier, Lucien Lerat, Phyllis Pray Bober, Fernand Benoit, and Noël Mahéo all identify the ear as such.) but has also been thought to represent the ear of a horse, goat, donkey, wolf, or bull. The divergence between its representation on the Besançon and Amiens statuettes has led Lerat to suggest that the choice of animal to model the deity's ear was arbitrary.

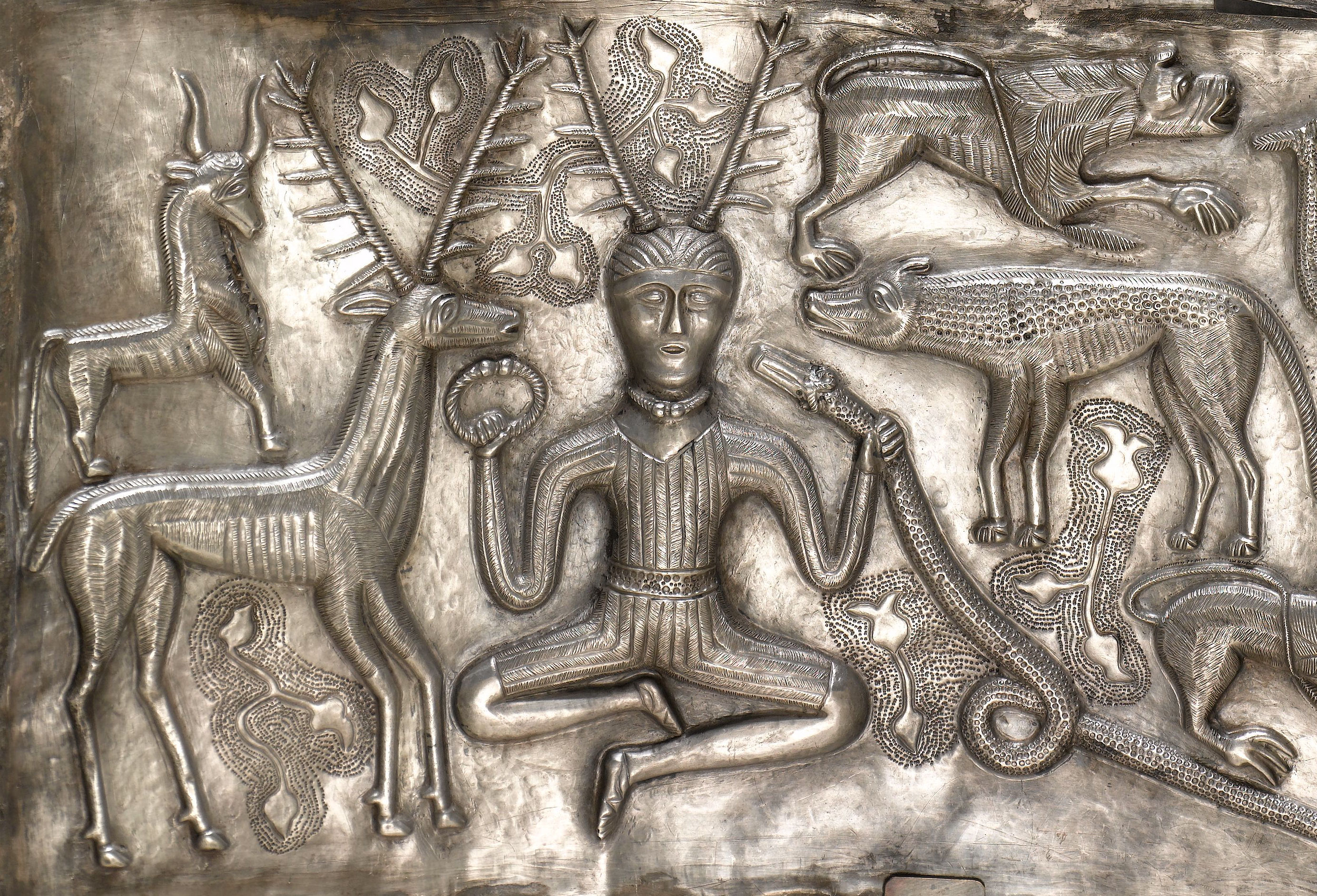
Cernunnos on the Gundestrup cauldron

Some connection with the Celtic stag-god Cernunnos has been suggested, especially among those who interpret the animal ear as that of a deer, but what the relationship between the two gods is supposed to be is unclear. Boucher suggests the animal ear serves to heighten Cernunnos's non-human, and hence super-human, nature. Cernunnos is associated with (horned) serpents. Lerat points out that he is depicted on the Gundestrup cauldron grasping a serpent in his left hand.

== See also ==
- God of Bouray
- God of Étang-sur-Arroux
- Lyon cup
- Muri statuette group
