= Musée de Picardie =

Museum in France

Coordinates: 49.8905°N 2.2953°E

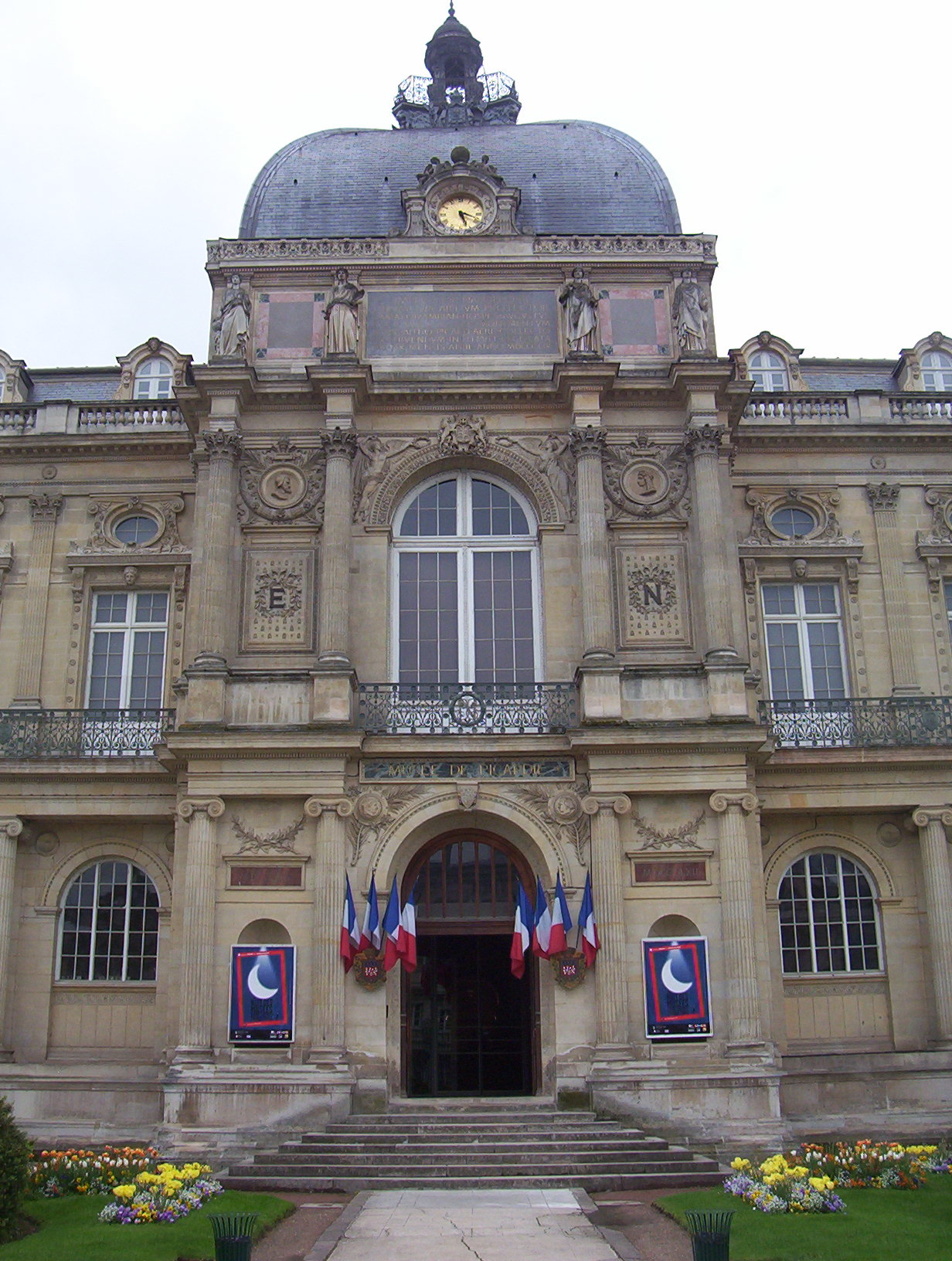
Second Empire style facade of the Musée de Picardie.

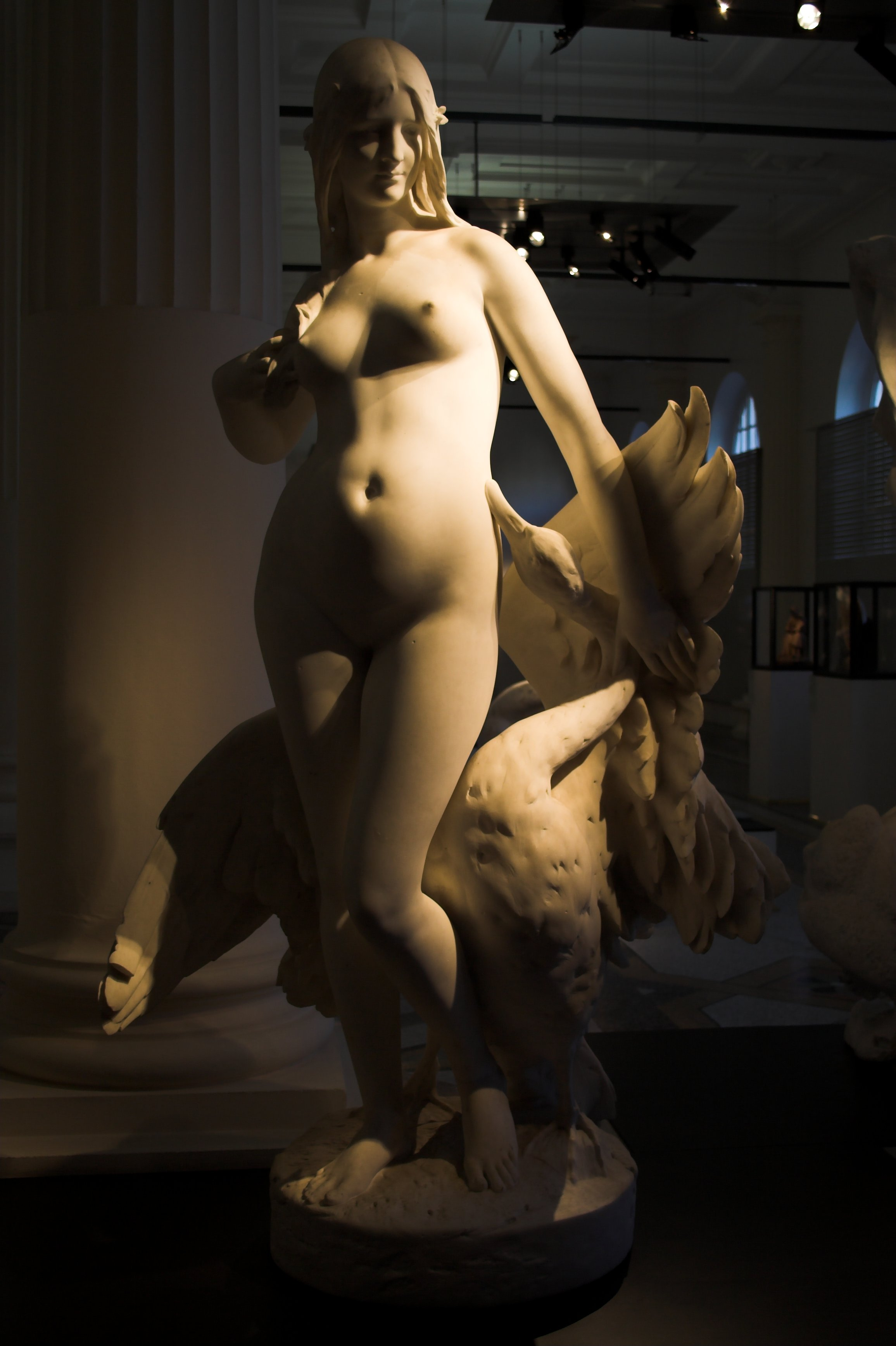
Leda and the swan by Jules Roulleau.

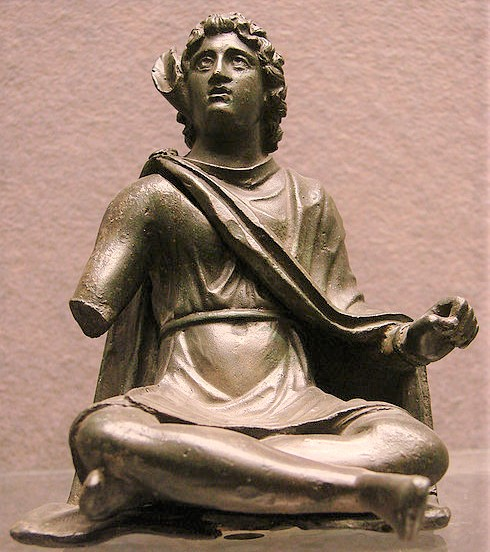
The God of Amiens.

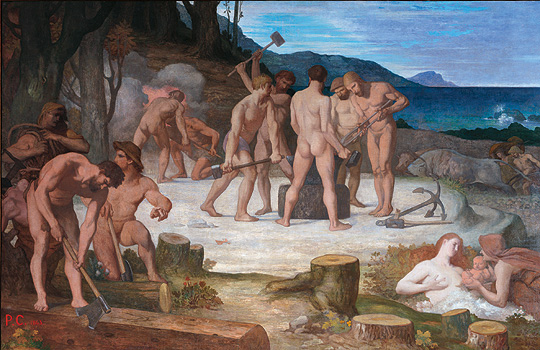
Work, by Pierre Puvis de Chavannes, 1863.

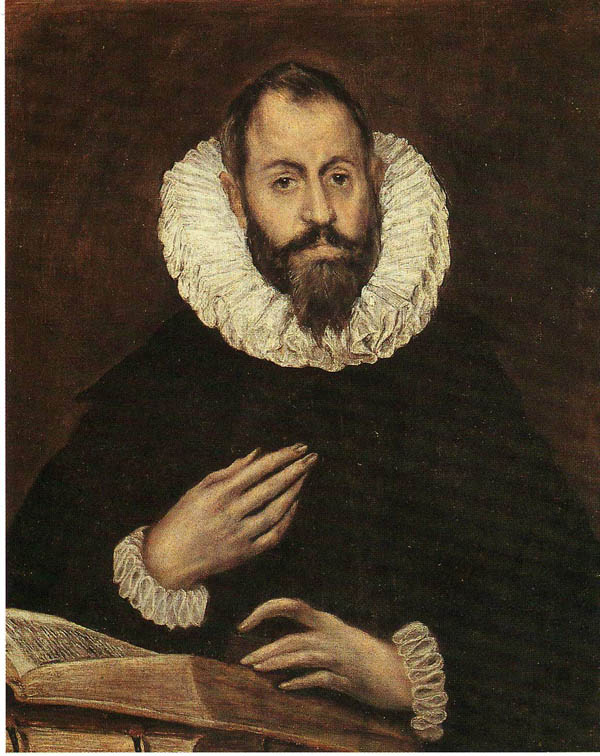
Portrait of a Man, El Greco, circa 1600-1610

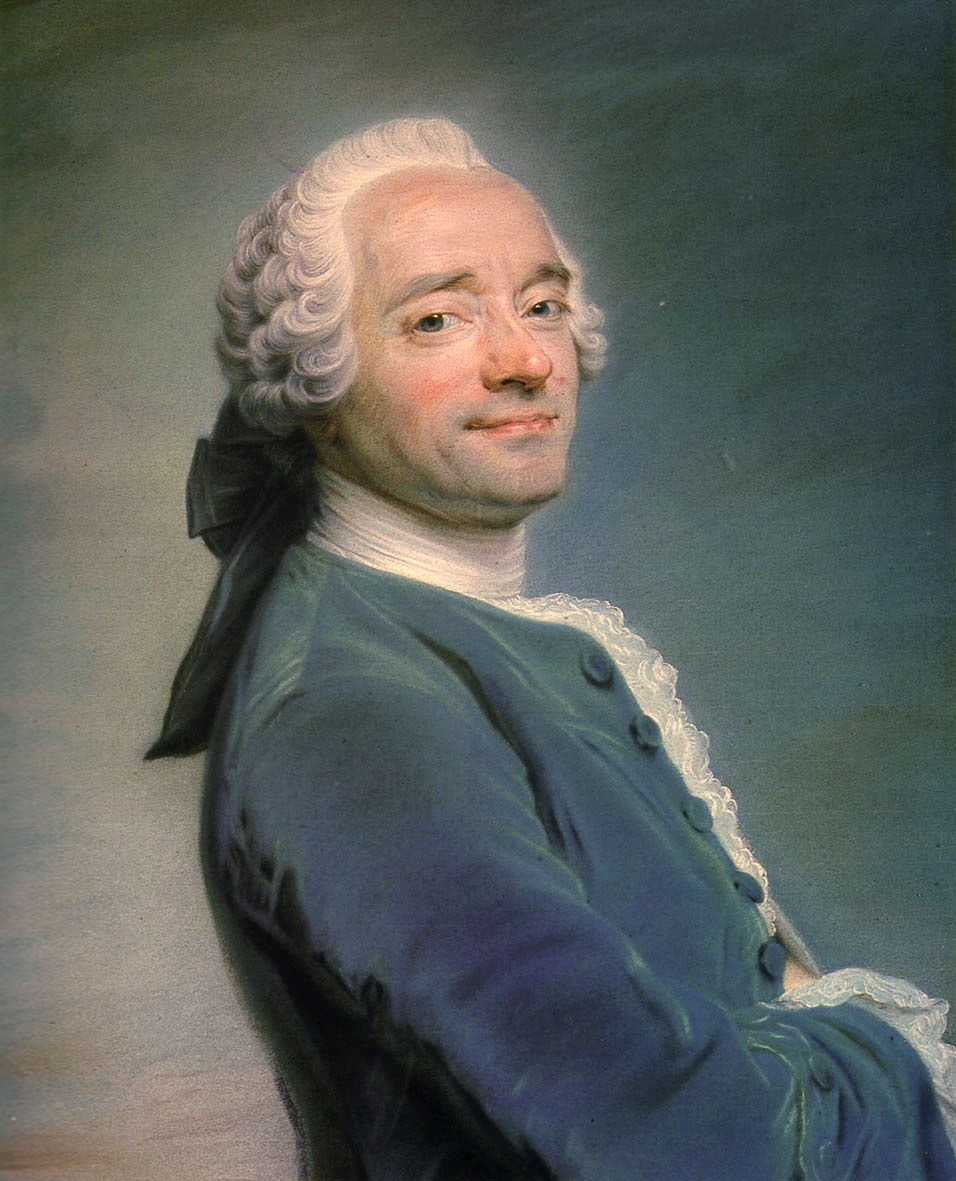
Self-portrait, Maurice Quentin de La Tour, circa 1751

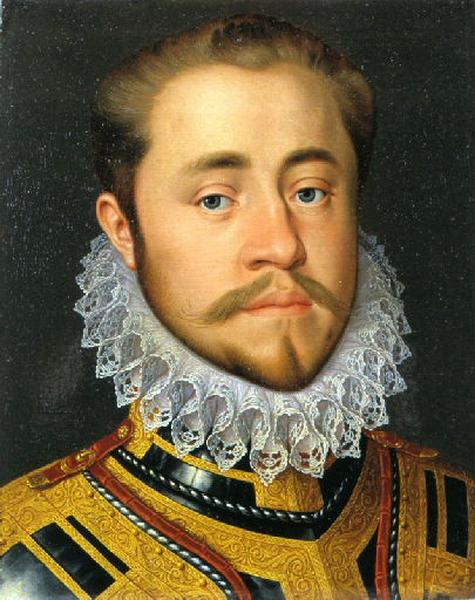
Portrait of a Gentleman in armour, Pourbus Pieter, oil on panel, 3rd quarter of the 16th century

The Musée de Picardie is the main museum of Amiens and Picardy, in France. It is located at 48, rue de la République, Amiens. Its collections include artifacts ranging from prehistory to the 19th century, and form one of the largest regional museums in France.

As an institution, the museum was founded as the Musée Napoléon in 1802 (the year of the Treaty of Amiens). However, the current building that houses the museum is more recent, being purpose-built as a regional museum between 1855 and 1867. The Second Empire style building was designed by architects Henri Parent and Arthur-Stanislas Diet. It was built thanks to the Société des Antiquaires de Picardie, keen to give the city somewhere to house the collections the society had gathered over decades. A prototype for other French regional museums, it was France's first building constructed exclusively for the purpose of conservation and exhibition of artworks.

== Collections ==
=== Archaeology ===
Housed in the basement, archaeological collections include artifacts from:

- ancient Greece
- ancient Egypt, with around 400 objects (of which 257 are on show), mainly derived from the collection of the painter Albert Maignan and from national collections placed here
- the archaeology of Picardy, including unique Gravettian culture Upper Paleolithic finds from the Amiens-Renancourt 1 archeological site

The museum is home to the mummified remains of an Egyptian woman named Setjaïmengaou. She died aged around 40 in the 7th century BC.

The museum is also home to the God of Amiens, a Gallo-Roman statuette of an animal-eared Gaulish god. The Priapus of Rivery is also in the collections of the museum.

=== Medieval ===
12th to 16th centuries, with the main pieces being the Puys d'Amiens, masterpieces of Gothic art from Amiens Cathedral.

=== Fine arts ===
French and foreign painters from 17th to 20th centuries, with artists such as:

- Francis Bacon
- François Boucher
- Jean Siméon Chardin
- Camille Corot
- Gustave Courbet
- Jacob Gerritsz Cuyp
- Philippe de Champaigne
- Jusepe de Ribera
- Jean-Honoré Fragonard
- Luca Giordano
- El Greco
- Francesco Guardi
- Frans Hals
- Eugène Lepoittevin
- Jacob Jordaens
- Joan Miró
- Francis Picabia
- Pablo Picasso
- Maurice Quentin de La Tour
- Alfred-Georges Regner, painter engraver
- Andrea Schiavone
- Hyacinthe Rigaud
- Hubert Robert
- Giambattista Tiepolo
- Rogier van der Weyden
- Jan van Goyen
- Alvise Vivarini
- Simon Vouet
- Édouard Vuillard

Pierre Puvis de Chavannes painted monumental frescoes on the museum's main staircase and first floor galleries, including the two large symbolic frescoes Peace and War (1861) and Work and Rest (1863).

An 1822 painting by Jérôme-Martin Langlois, Diana and Endymion, was displayed at the museum from 1878. It was believed to have destroyed in bombing in 1918 during World War I and was part of the Musée de Picardie's collection that had been evacuated to the Louvre for safekeeping. The painting was missing from the works that were returned to Amiens from the Louvre after the end of the war. It was initially described as "untraceable since the return of the 1918 removed works" and subsequently as "destroyed by the falling of a bomb on the museum". It may be in the private collection of the American performer Madonna.

== Musée de l'Hôtel de Berny ==
Located near Amiens Cathedral, the Hôtel de Berny is an annexe of the Musée de Picardie.

== Bibliography ==
- (in French) Matthieu Pinette, Couleurs d'Italie, couleurs du Nord - Peintures étrangères des musées d'Amiens, édition Somogy, Paris, 2001.
