= Sommerécourt =

- Commune
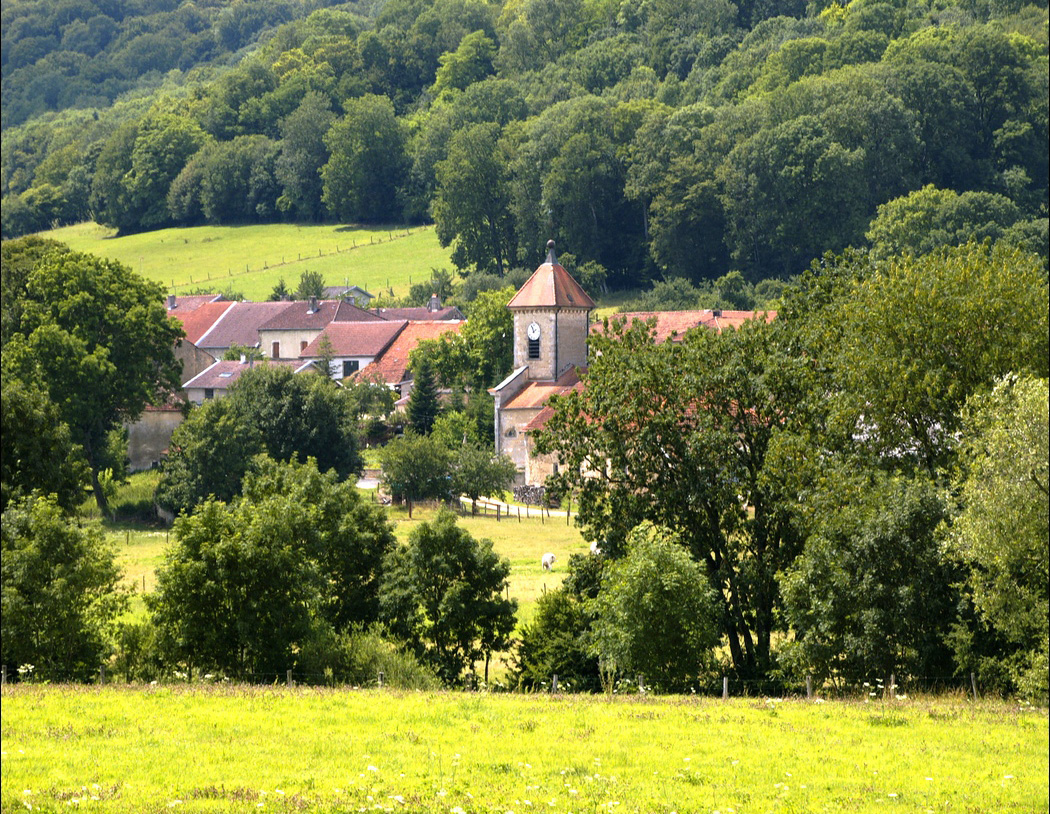
- The church and surroundings in Sommerécourt
- Location of Sommerécourt
- Location within France Location within Grand Est
- Coordinates: 48°13′36″N 5°39′41″E
- Country: France
- Region: Grand Est
- Department: Haute-Marne
- Arrondissement: Chaumont
- Canton: Poissons

Government
  - Mayor (2020–2026): Christophe Limaux
- Area^{1}: 7.66 km^{2} (2.96 sq mi)
- Elevation: 315 m (1,033 ft)
- Population (2023): 75
  - Density: 9.8/km^{2} (25/sq mi)
- Time zone: UTC+01:00 (CET)
  - Summer (DST): UTC+02:00 (CEST)
- INSEE/Postal code: 52476 /52150
- ^{1} French Land Register data, which excludes lakes, ponds, glaciers > 1 km^{2} (0.386 sq mi or 247 acres) and river estuaries.

Sommerécourt (French pronunciation: [sɔmʁekuʁ]) is a commune in the Haute-Marne department in north-eastern France.

== See also ==
- Communes of the Haute-Marne department
