= Warren Cup =

Ancient Greco-Roman drinking cup

The Warren Cup
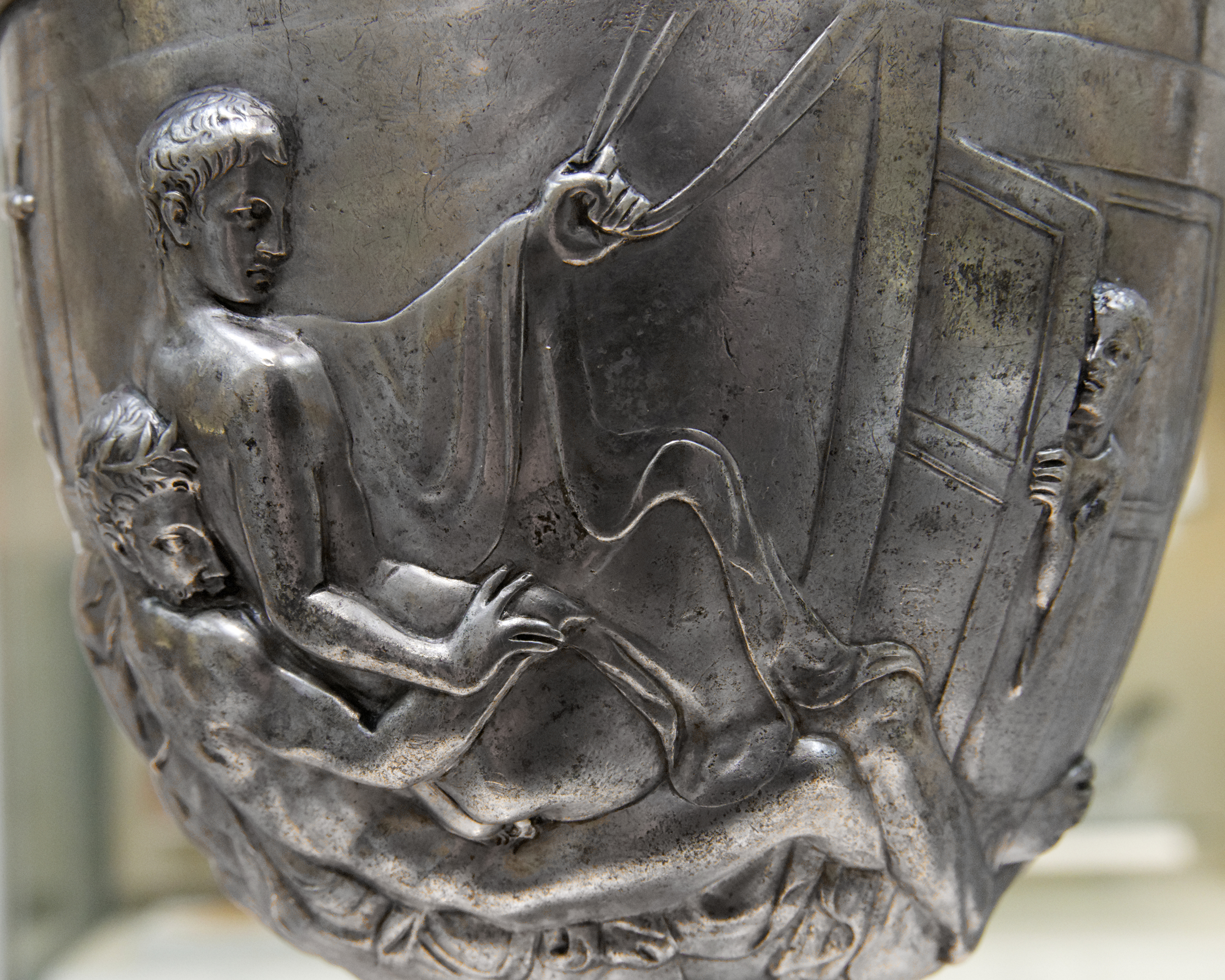
- Warren Cup, side A
- Material: Silver
- Size: height:11 cm (4.3 in), width:9.9 cm (3.9 in) (max.), depth:11 cm (4.3 in)
- Created: Greco-Roman, 5–15 AD
- Present location: Room 70, British Museum, London
- Identification: GR 1999,0426.1

The Warren Cup is an ancient Greco-Roman silver drinking cup decorated in relief with two images of male same-sex acts. It was purchased by the British Museum for £1.8 million in 1999, the most expensive single purchase by the museum at that time. It is usually dated to the time of the Julio-Claudian dynasty (1st century AD). The cup originally had two vertical handles, now lost.

The cup is named after American art collector Edward Perry Warren, its first modern owner. Warren also owned the marble version of Rodin's The Kiss, now in Tate Modern, and an Adam and Eve by Lucas Cranach the Elder, now in the Courtauld Institute of Art, both also in London.

== Imagery ==
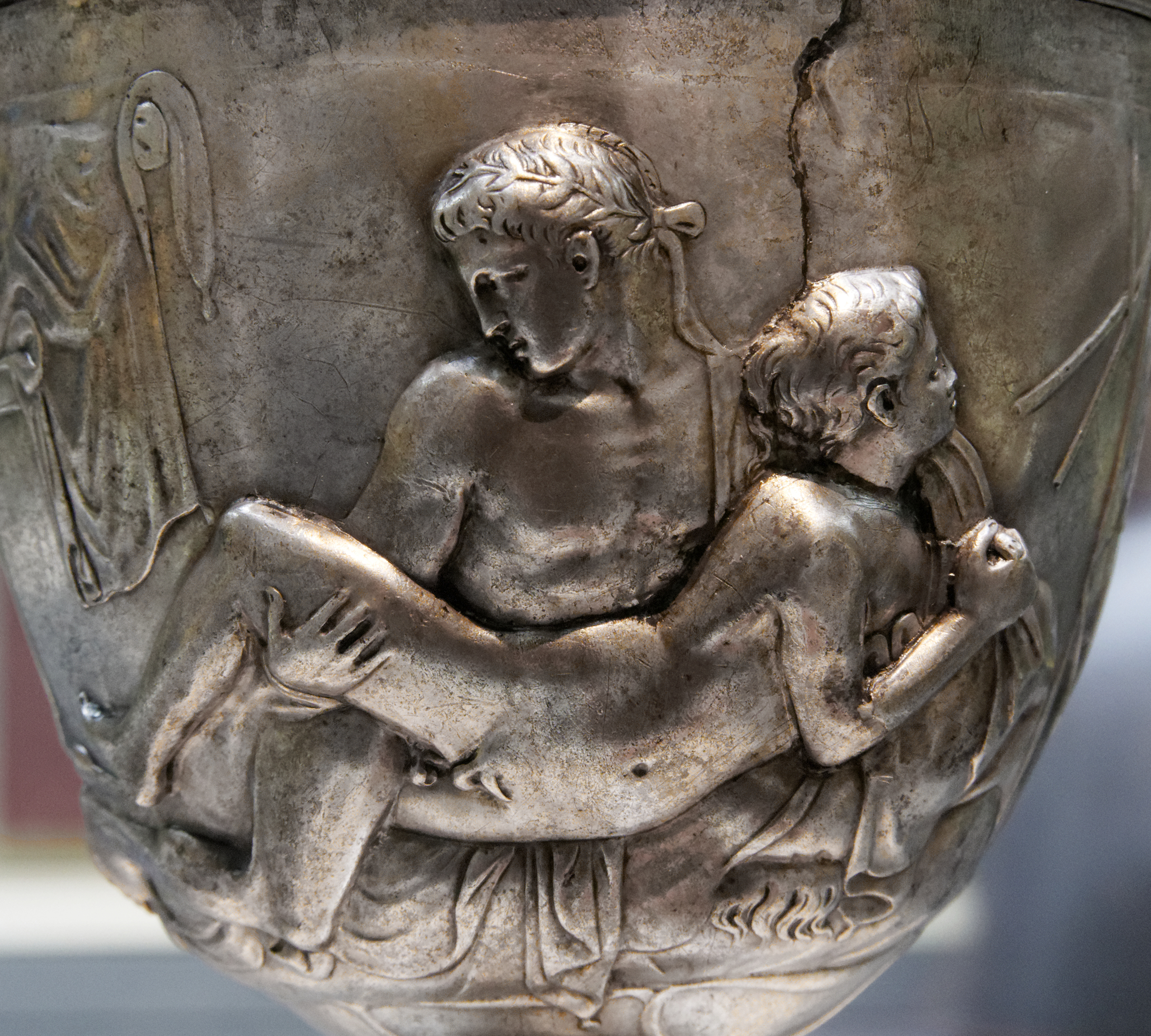
Warren Cup, side B

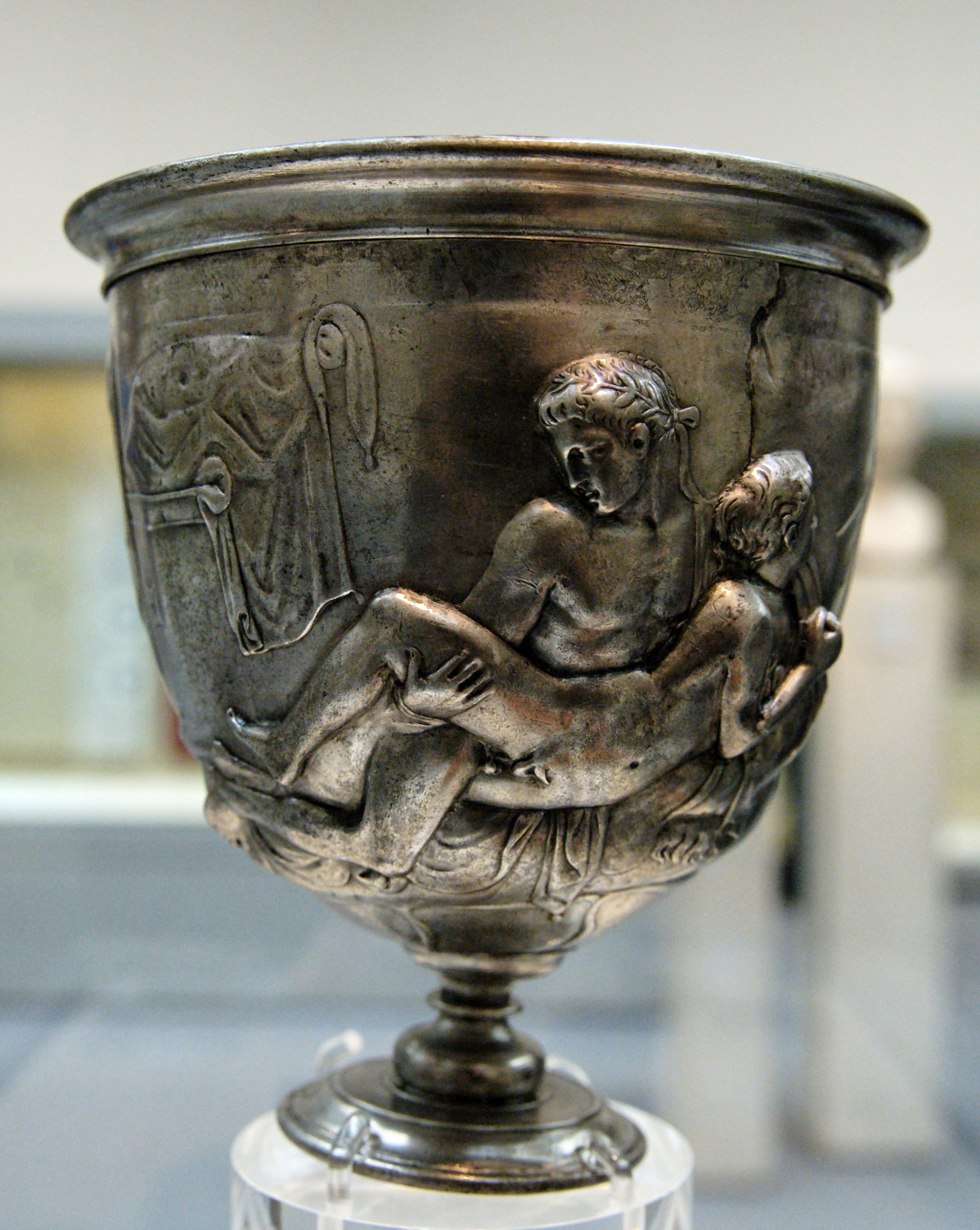
Overall view

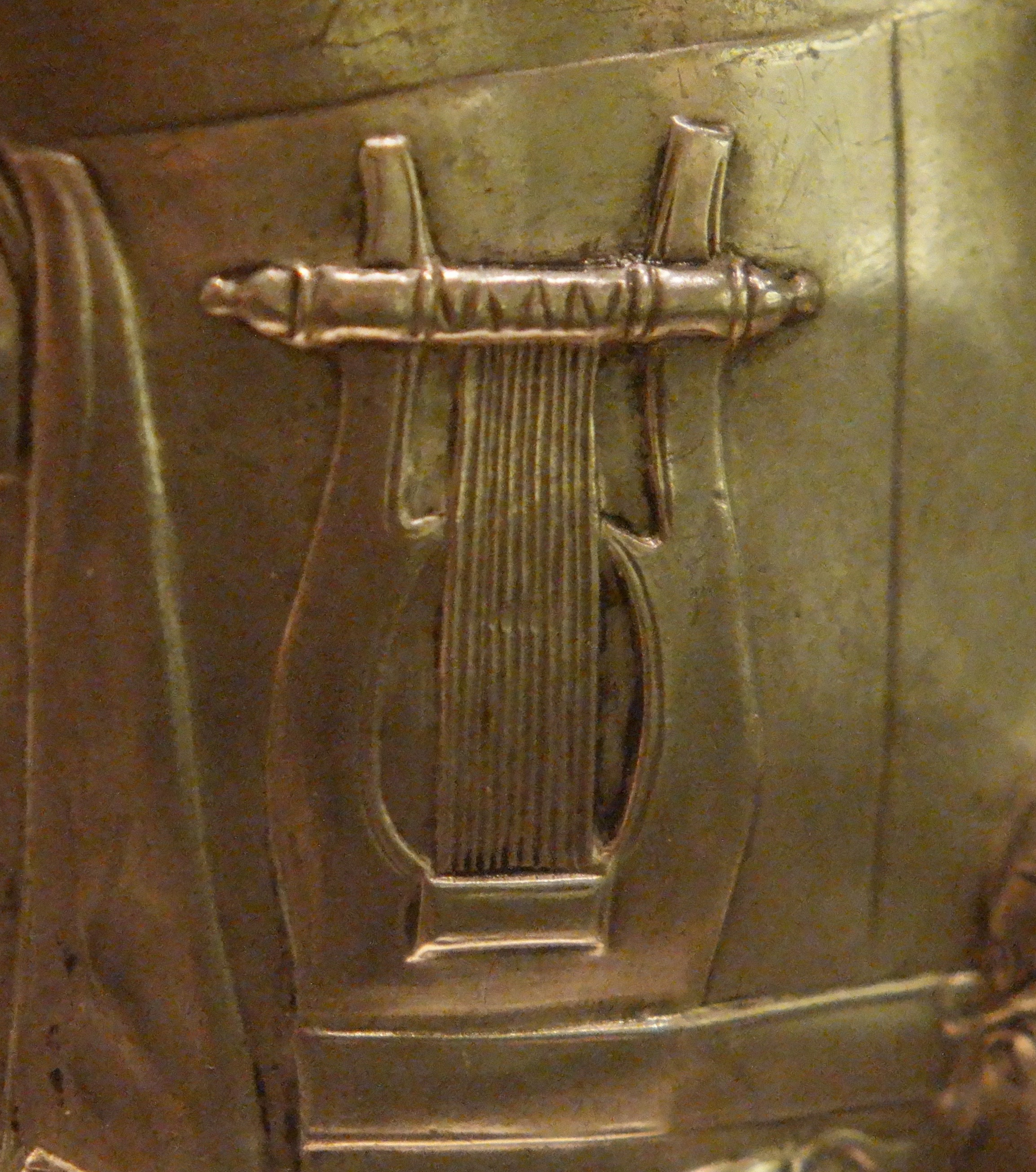
Warren Cup, cithara detail.

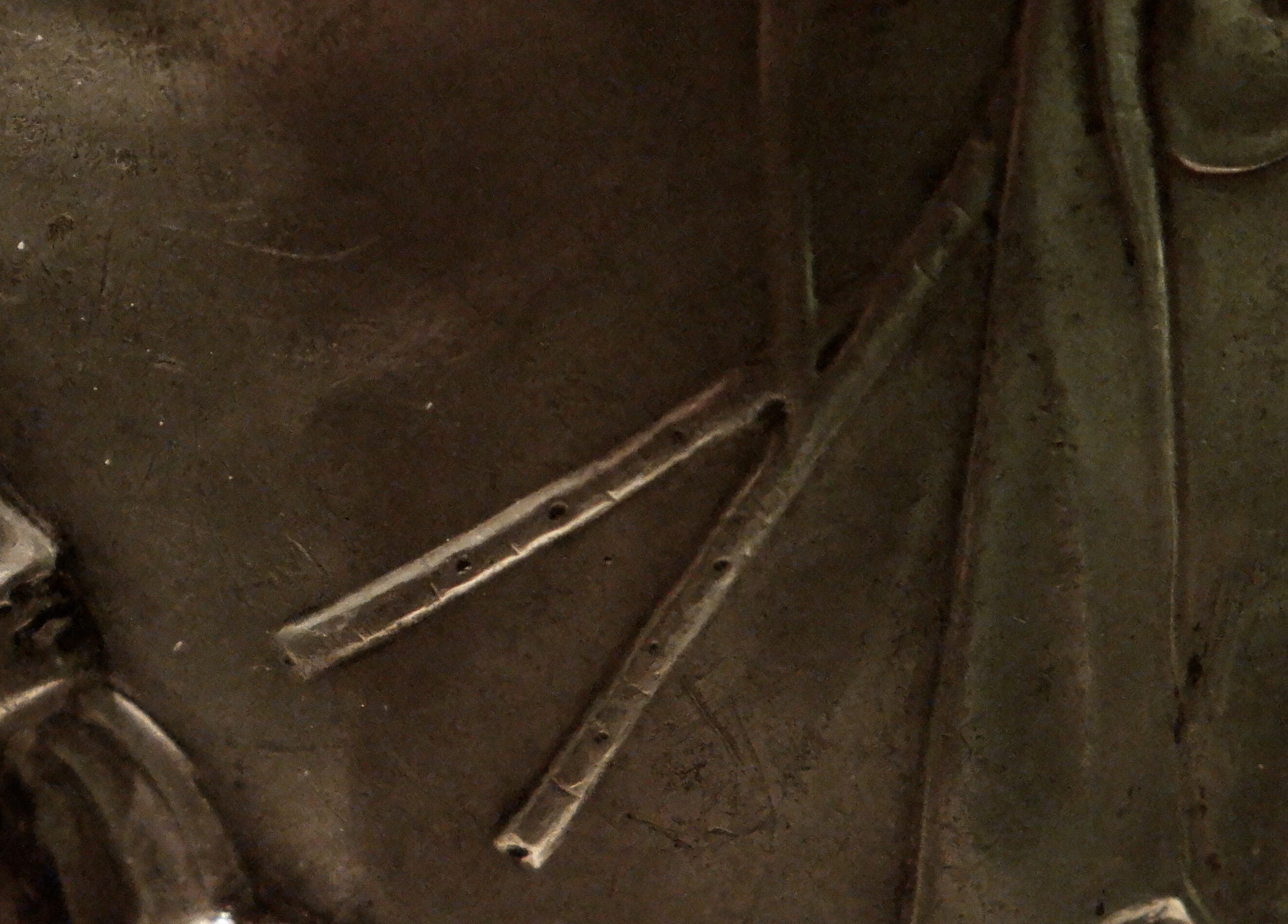
Warren Cup, tibiae detail.

Representations of sexual acts are widely found in Roman art, although surviving male-female scenes greatly outnumber same-sex couples. It cannot be assumed that homoerotic art was uncommon as the modern record may be biased due to selective destruction or non-publication of pederastic works in later times. Illustrated drinking cups, often in pairs, were intended as dinner-party conversation pieces. Roman artwork on pottery, glass and wall-paintings with sexual acts represented were popular and were intended to be seen by all sections of society. The Romans had no word for homosexuality, and the images on the Warren Cup provide an important insight into this aspect of their culture.

One side of the Warren Cup depicts a "bearded man" and a "beardless youth" engaging in anal sex in a reclining position, with the youth lowering himself using a strap or sash to be penetrated. A boy watches from behind a door. The two figures do not appear to be a great difference in age and are of a similar size. The apparent weight of the upper figure, as he lowers himself onto his lover's penis using the support, makes this a non-traditional passive role. The use of a strap or support during sex can be found in other Greek and Roman artworks, a close example being an erotic cup by Onesimos where a woman spreads her legs in anticipation while grasping a strap with her left hand.

The other side depicts another scene of anal sex, between a "beardless" and clean-shaven "young man" and a smaller figure with long hair, indicating he is a "boy" or "adolescent" (now the "eromenos"). The boy's hairstyle is typical of the puer delicatus, a servant-boy or cup or armour bearer. Roman same-sex practice differed from that of the Greeks, among whom pederasty was a socially acknowledged relationship between freeborn males of equal social status. Roman men, however, were free to engage in same-sex relations without a perceived loss of masculinity only as long as they took the penetrative role and their partner was a social inferior such as a slave or male prostitute: the paradigm of "correct" male sexuality was one of conquest and domination. There are significant differences to pederastic scenes found on classical Greek vases. The sex act is presented in graphic detail, and the "beardless youth" appears to encourage the penetration, grasping his lover's arm. In Roman artwork there is an assumption that the penetrated youth is a slave or prostitute and on the Warren Cup, a mutual tenderness is represented.

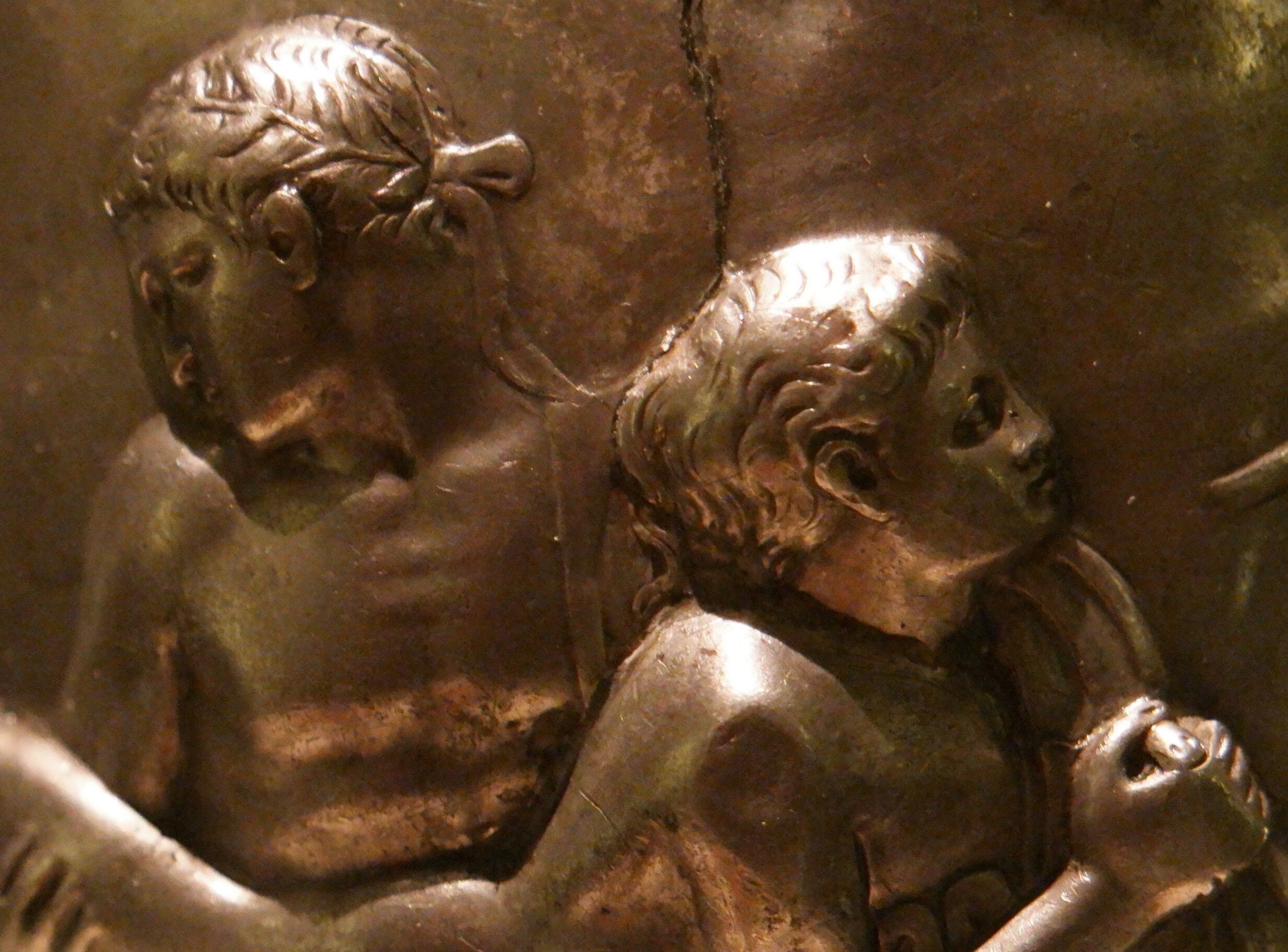
Warren Cup side B, showing detail for hairstyles and leaf crown.

Both scenes show draped textiles in the background, as well as a cithara (appearing as an eleven-stringed lyre, often symbolic of pleasure and drinking parties) in the former scene and tibiae (reeded pipes) with finger holes being depicted in the latter. These, along with the careful delineation of ages and status and the wreaths worn by the youths, all suggest a cultured, elite, Hellenized setting with music and entertainment.

The active partners in the two sexual depictions are wearing leaf crowns, likely to be symbolically made from myrtle. Myrtle is an evergreen shrub, grown in the Roman period for medical and ritual purposes, such as weddings, and dedicated to Venus, the Roman goddess of sexuality and love. It has a smaller leaf than the more commonly depicted laurel. Myrtle was used to create the corona ovalis, a military crown awarded as an ovation but a far lesser award than the insignis corona triumphalis, one interpretation of the use of myrtle crowns on the Warren Cup, being a visual pun of homosexual penetration as an easy victory.

== Modern provenance ==
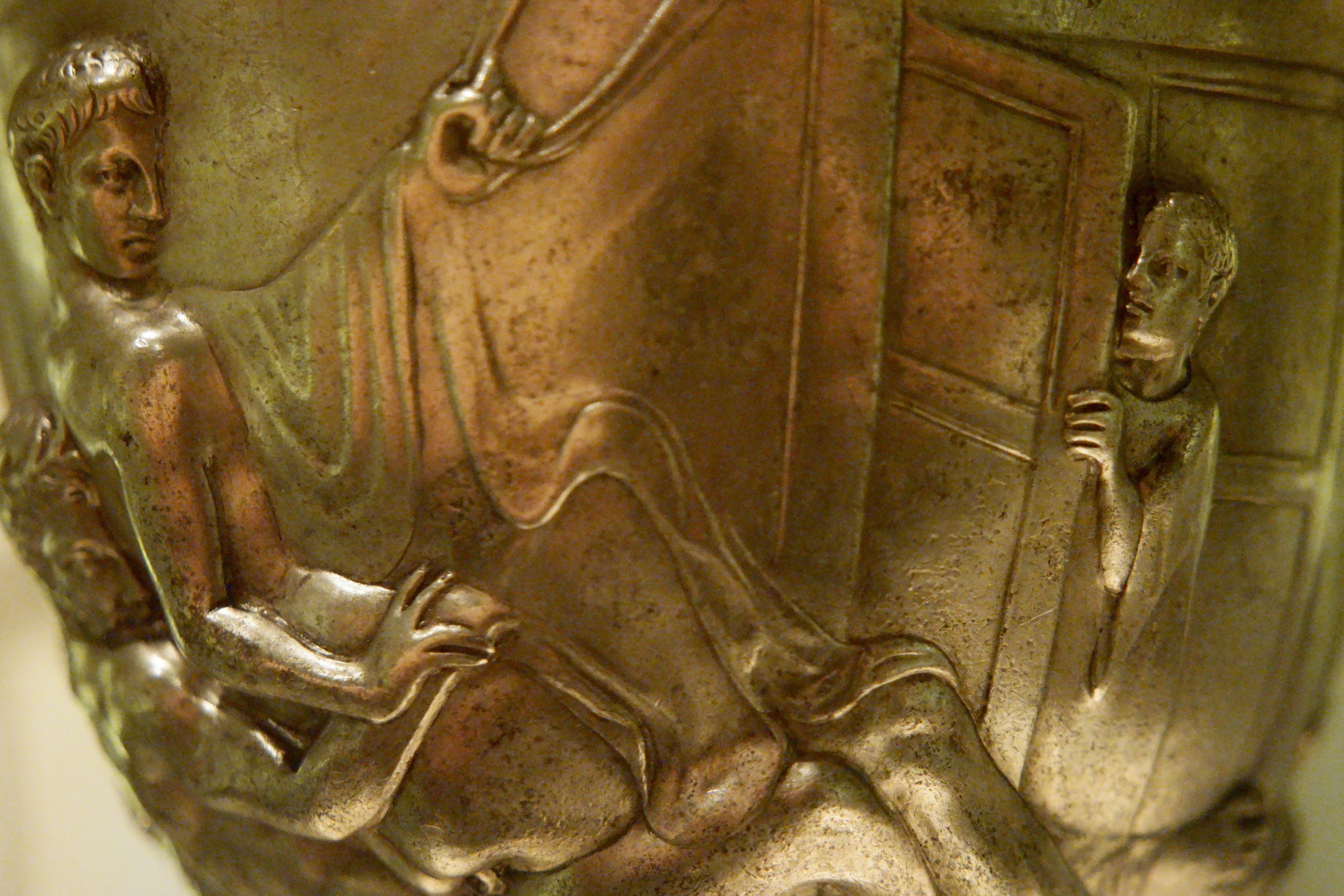
View of the figure in the doorway

Warren purchased the cup in Rome from a dealer in 1911 for £2,000 (equivalent to £204,000 in 2025). It was bought in Jerusalem and said to have been found near the city of Battir in Palestine (ancient Betar), with coins of the emperor Claudius, possibly buried during the upheavals of the First Jewish Revolt (66–73 AD).

We don't know for certain, but it is thought that the Warren Cup was found buried at Bittir, a town a few miles south-west of Jerusalem. How it got to this location is a mystery, but we can make a guess. We can date the making of the cup to around the year 10. About 50 years later, the Roman occupation of Jerusalem sparked tensions between the rulers and the Jewish community, and in AD 66 that exploded and the Jews took back the city by force. There were violent confrontations, and it is thought that our cup may have been buried at this date by the owner fleeing from the fighting.

— Neil MacGregor, British Museum Director, A History of the World

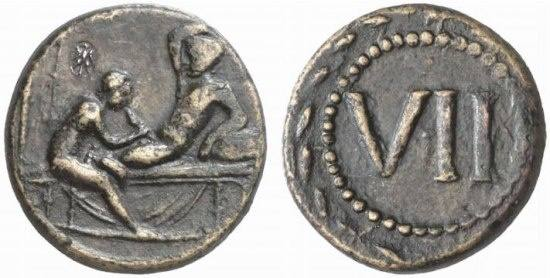
Oral sex between a youth and an older male on a Roman Spintria token

The cup became a prized item in Warren's large art collection, referring to it with friends as the "Holy Grail". The first publication featuring the cup was in 1921, when Gaston Vorberg published a volume of 113 plates of erotic artwork from ancient artefacts. The photographs show the cup in an uncleaned state. The cup was included in Warren's book A defence of Uranian Love, first published in 1928 under his pseudonym of Arthur Lyon Raile.

On Warren's death in 1928, the cup became part of the inheritance for Asa Thomas, Warren's secretary and eventual business partner. It was part of the auction of the contents of Lewes House in 1929, but failed to sell and stayed hidden away in the Thomas' attic. The cup was sent for cleaning after the Lewes House auction and photographs taken of the cup in 1931 show that it had been cleaned before that year.

In November 1952 Harold W. Parsons, an art historian and one of Warren's past companions, took responsibility for selling the cup and approached the New York collector Walter Baker, however Baker was hesitant to proceed. In February 1953 it was posted by Thomas to Walter Baker, however US Customs impounded the box requiring a decision from Washington as to whether to admit it or to prohibit it as pornography. It was refused entry to the US on that basis and it took until October 1954 to be returned to the UK, by which time Thomas had died. After that event, a number of museums declined to buy it. Thomas's widow sold the cup to the dealer John K. Hewett. Hewett offered the cup to Denys Haynes, Keeper of the Greek and Roman Department at the British Museum who then sought an opinion from his friend Lord Crawford, a trustee of the museum. However, the decision went no further as they thought that they would never persuade the museum's Trustees who were chaired by the Archbishop of Canterbury.

In 1966 the Cup was offered for sale at £6,000 (equivalent to £98,000 in 2025) and bought by a private collector abroad.

In 1998 it was removed from the Metropolitan Museum of Art and sold to a British private collector. The cup was then acquired by its present owner, the British Museum, in 1999 for £1.8 million (equivalent to £3.45 million in 2025), with funds provided by the Heritage Lottery Fund, National Art Collections Fund and The British Museum Friends, to prevent its going abroad again. This was, at that time, the most expensive single item ever acquired by the British Museum, and many times the price at which it had been offered to them in the 1950s.

== Dating and authenticity ==
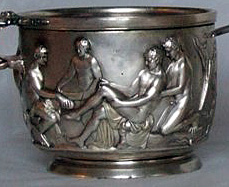
Hoby silver skyphos, dated to AD 10–20, showing nude male figures in relief similar to the Warren Cup. Of Roman manufacture, it was found in Denmark.

John R. Clarke, Professor in Fine Arts at the University of Texas at Austin, has approximated the dating of the cup with similarly styled objects found in Pompeii, due to the lack of archaeological context.

Dyfri Williams, previously the Keeper of Greek and Roman Antiquities at the British Museum, dated the cup to 5–15 CE. Williams identified several factors supporting that dating. The silver alloy being 95% pure is consistent with other known Roman silver vessels, with silver from later periods having a far higher purity. Cracks in the cup retain chemical corrosion products which are symptomatic of age, remaining despite being cleaned twice during the 20th century. An EDX analysis showed that the corrosion was silver chloride. Subsequent testing in 2015 of the inside repoussé shelf and the reverse of the liner, neither of which had been cleaned, found substantial silver chloride corrosion. The decorative style and shape have a close parallel with many other vessels of the period, such as the Chryses kantharos and the closely matching figures of nude men on the Hoby skyphoi, discovered in Lolland in Denmark a decade after the Warren cup was first recorded.

In 2008 and 2013, Maria Teresa Marabini Moevs argued on iconographic grounds that the Warren Cup is a modern forgery executed around 1900 to meet the tastes of Edward Perry Warren, the amateur collector who introduced the artifact to the world. Luca Giuliani, a professor of Classical Archaeology at Humboldt University, initially also argued on iconographic grounds that the Warren Cup was likely to be a twentieth-century forgery. However, he subsequently found that evidence of substantial silver chloride corrosion conclusively established the cup's authenticity.

== Manufacture and condition ==
The Warren Cup is an estimated 95% pure silver with some copper and trace amounts of lead and gold. It was made in five sections:

1. the main bowl, which was hammered thin from inside and subsequently finished off from the outside to produce the figures in relief;
2. a separate plain inner liner bowl of thicker sheet silver with a solid rim, to make the cup easier to use and to clean;
3. a base in solid silver;
4. a cast foot soldered to the base;
5. two handles, now missing.

The cup is etched and pitted due to the effect of corrosive cleaning deposits; however, remnants of silver chloride and black silver sulphide survive in crevices. A crack runs from the rim, around the figure of the boy on one side. The base is distorted and broken with the pedestal having been pushed up, denting the cup and causing the cup to lean at an angle. The damage to the base was in modern times, thought to have occurred when the cup was cleaned in the 20th century. The foot was soldered back on to the cup in modern times. It is thought that the cup was moulded twice in modern times due to remains of plaster and silicone rubber found in crevices.

== Exhibition history ==
During the 1920s, Warren lent the cup to the Martin von Wagner Museum in Würzburg.

In 1985 through to 1991 the Warren Cup was on loan and on display by the Antikenmuseum Basel und Sammlung Ludwig, Basel. From 1992 to 1998, the cup was put on display at Metropolitan Museum of Art in New York as an anonymous loan.

It was the subject of a devoted exhibition in Room 3 at the British Museum from 11 May to 2 July 2006, entitled "The Warren Cup: Sex and society in ancient Greece and Rome."

We wanted to show this fantastic object in a context in which we could ask how much we understand about attitudes to sexuality when it was made. These objects seem extraordinary to us now, but there were many objects in common use, and wall paintings and mosaics in baths and in private houses, showing very similar imagery.

— Dyfri Williams, British Museum Keeper

From December 2006 to January 2007 it was exhibited at the Yorkshire Museum. The Warren Cup is the 36th object in A History of the World in 100 Objects, a BBC Radio 4 series first broadcast in 2010. In 2011 (January to April) it was lent to the University of Nottingham for an exhibition in the Weston Gallery titled "Roman Sexuality: Images, Myths and Meanings."

In 2012 the cup was exhibited at Plymouth City Museum and Art Gallery in an LGBT "Pride in Our Past Exhibition".

An exhibition on the Isle of Wight on "Roman Sexuality: Images, Myths and Meanings" featured the cup in February to July 2014, at the Brading Roman Villa.

== Replicas ==
Due to his interest in the cup, Warren had a replica made for John Beazley. The replica was donated to the Ashmolean Museum, Oxford as part of the Beazley Gift in 1966. The replica became a prominent feature in an exhibition at the museum in 1985.

There are six known replicas of the original Warren Cup. In April 2014, a copy owned by an anonymous private collector in Cape Town, South Africa, was stolen.

== See also ==
- Catamite
- Erotic art in Pompeii and Herculaneum
- Greek love
- History of erotic depictions
- History of human sexuality
- Homosexuality in ancient Rome
- Homosexuality in ancient Greece
- Pederasty
- Pederasty in ancient Greece
- Sexuality in ancient Rome

== Footnotes ==
Preceded by 35: Meroë Head	A History of the World in 100 Objects; Object 36	Succeeded by 37: North American otter pipe
