= Lyon cup =

Silver Gallo-Roman cup found in Lyon, France

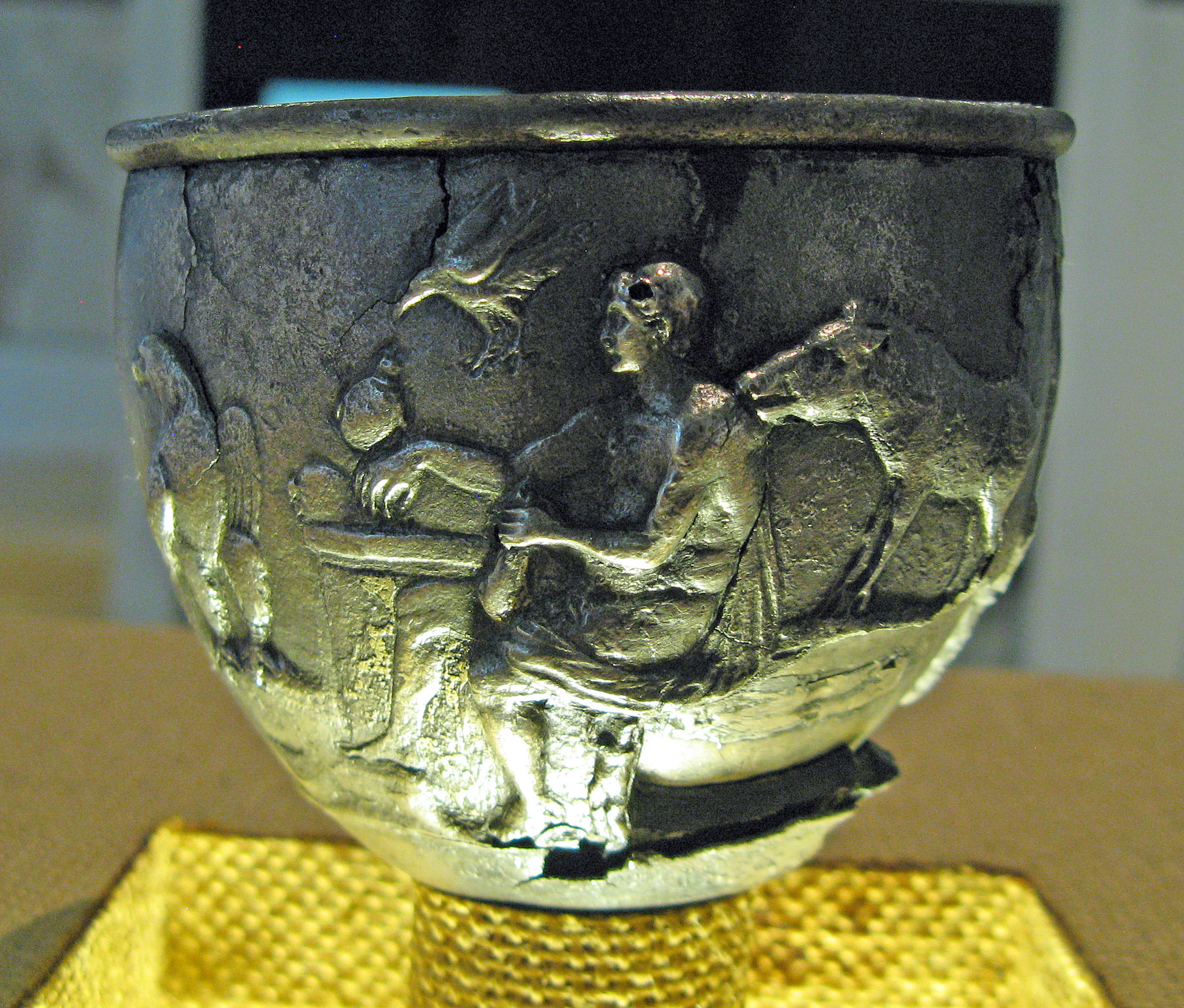
Lyon cup scene showing a seated male at a table bearing purses, with a boar at his shoulder, a raven and a tortoise (or purse) above the table, and a perching eagle turned away at left

The Lyon cup (French: gobelet de Lyon) is a silver Gallo-Roman cup found in Lyon (Lugdunum in Roman times), France.

It is decorated in relief with a series of images: a reclining male figure with a deer and dog; a seated male figure with purses and a raven; an eagle confronting a serpent; two trees diametrically opposed. The wilderness scene has been interpreted variously as representing the gods Cernunnos and Mercury; the gods Cernunnos and Lugus; the god Apollo and a blessed devotee; and a complicated scene involving the divine trio Taranis, Teutates, and Esus. The raven is likely a symbol of the city Lugdunum.

The cup has been dated to the 1st century CE on the basis of its repoussé silverwork. The naturalistic relief is of unmistakably Gaulish influence and is probably evidence of a local workshop.

Discovered in 1929 during construction work, the cup is now in the collection of the Gallo-Roman Museum of Lyon-Fourvière.

== Discovery and later history ==
In 1929, during construction on the foundations of the house on 29 Rue Sala, Lyon, ancient masonry was uncovered, consistent with a Roman warehouse building. At a depth of 5 to 6 metres (16 to 20 ft), the Lyon cup was uncovered, alongside a deposit of Roman pottery. The cup was found broken into several pieces. The neighbourhood of this house is known to have had a number of grand villas and warehouses in Roman times.

In 1934, the cup was donated to the Musée des Beaux-arts de Lyon. It was later transferred to the Gallo-Roman Museum of Lyon-Fourvière. It was first discussed by Pierre Wuilleumier in an article published in Revue Archéologique in 1936.

== Metalwork and decoration ==
The cup is ovoid with a flat base. It has a height of 7.7 centimetres (3.0 in), a lower diameter of 3.3 centimetres (1.3 in), and an upper diameter of 8.8 centimetres (3.5 in). The decoration of the object was achieved by welding a thin, external silver sheet to a thicker inner structure, and working that external sheet in repoussé. In the 1st century CE, cups decorated in this manner were extremely popular and produced across the Roman empire (compare, for example, the Hoby cups found in Denmark). The cup can therefore be assigned a 1st-century date, but style alone is not enough to specify the date any further. Wuilleumier assigns it a date in the second half of this century, Gilbert Charles-Picard to the first half. A cup of this quality (and of such obvious Gaulish influence) implies the existence of a local workshop, with metalworkers skilled enough to both borrow from, and adapt to local tastes, a broader Mediterranean repertoire.

The decorations go all around the cup. From left to right: there is a leafless tree, with what is perhaps a bush of mistletoe at the end of one branch. A deer, facing the tree, overlaps with a male figure reclining on a bed. This figure's head has been destroyed, but we are able to make out a torc around his neck and the beginnings of a beard. The figure holds a torc in his right hand, and a cornucopia in his left. Two vertical elements resting against the bed have been interpreted by Charles-Picard as a kithara. A collared dog sits on its hind legs behind the figure, and lifts a paw towards him. Behind the dog, there is a leafless tree with a serpent curled multiple times around it. This serpent confronts a large eagle perched on a rock. Behind the eagle, a human figure is sat at a table. He has a purse in his left hand, and his right hand is on the table next what might be another purse. Underneath his thighs, there appears to be a small, nude human figure. Behind the seated figure is a boar, and above him is a raven. A circular object just above the table is either a tortoise confronting the raven (as Wuilleumier suggests) or a purse dropped by the raven (as Charles-Picard suggests).

=== Scenes on the cup ===
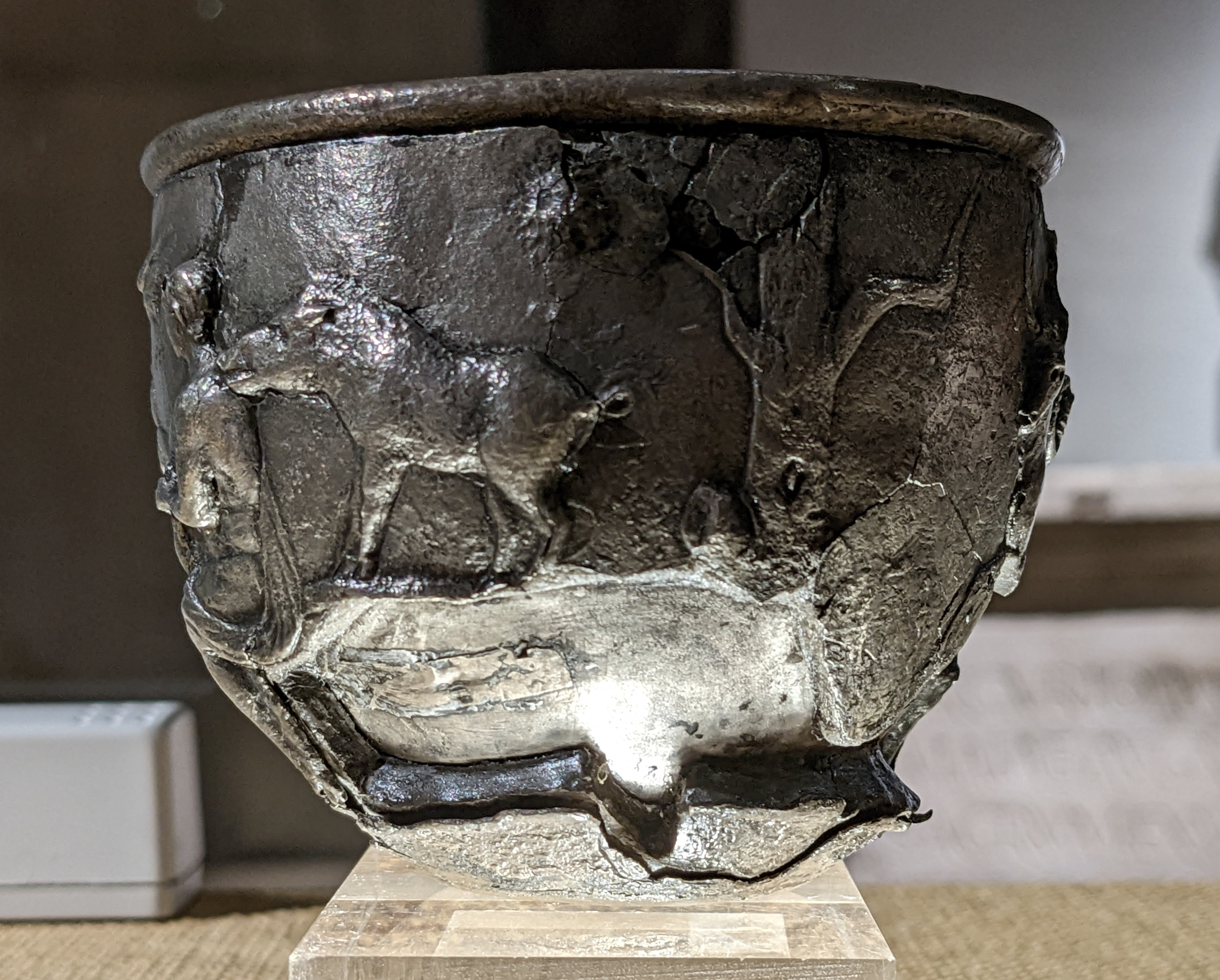
Boar (see image at top) and a tree, perhaps bearing mistletoe

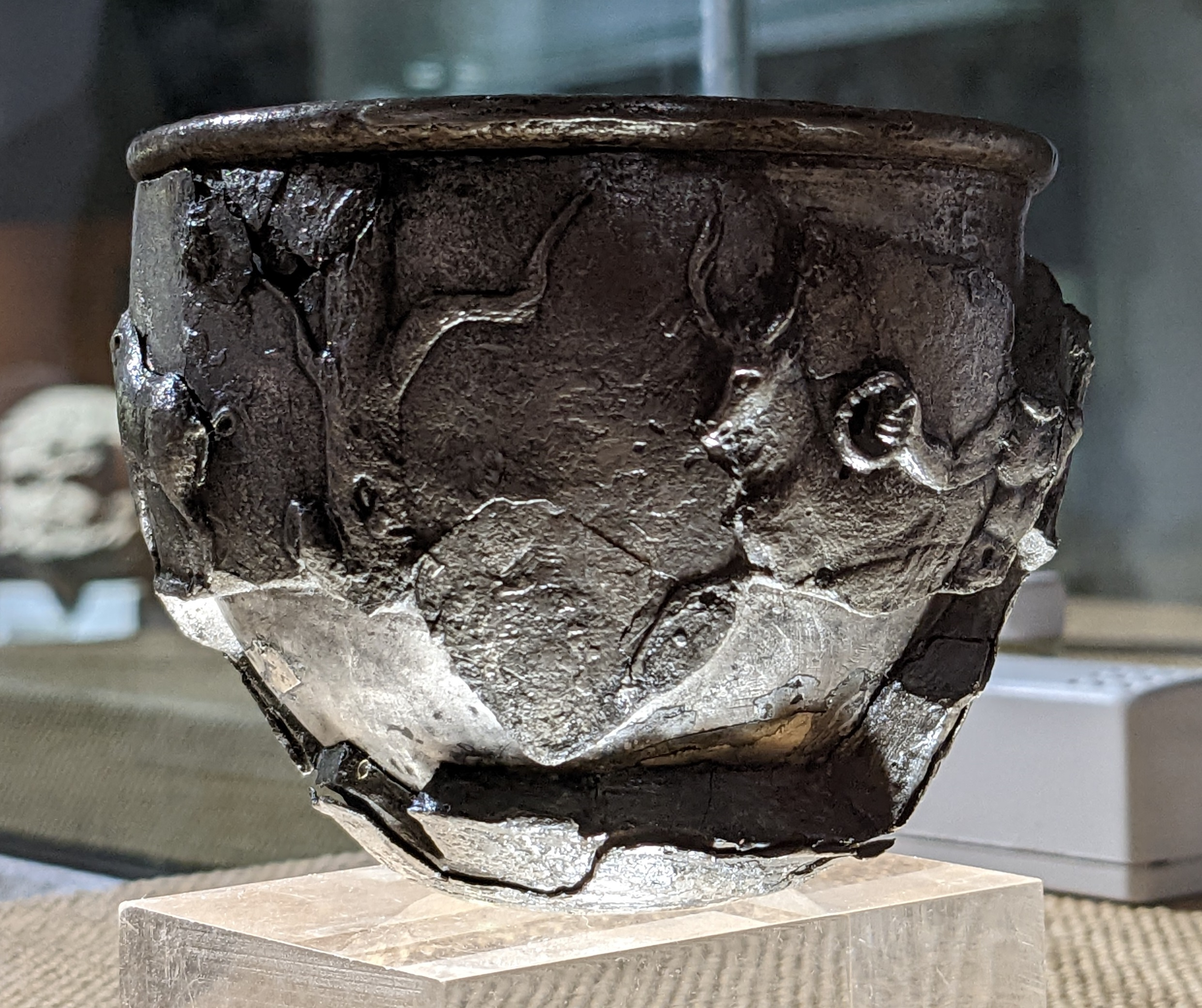
The tree with a stag, and an arm extending a torc toward it

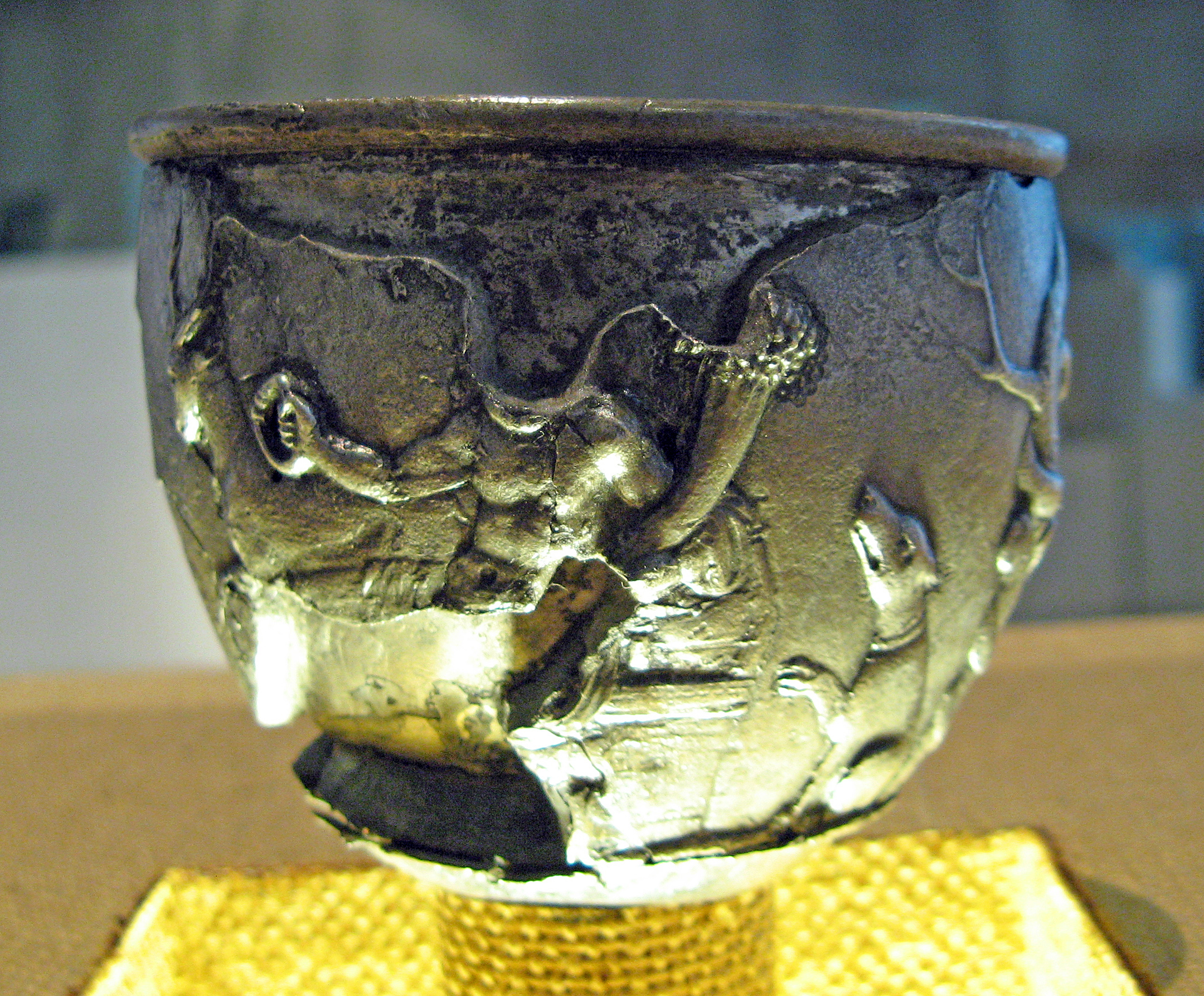
Reclining male extending the torc and holding a cornucopia, with a dog lower right

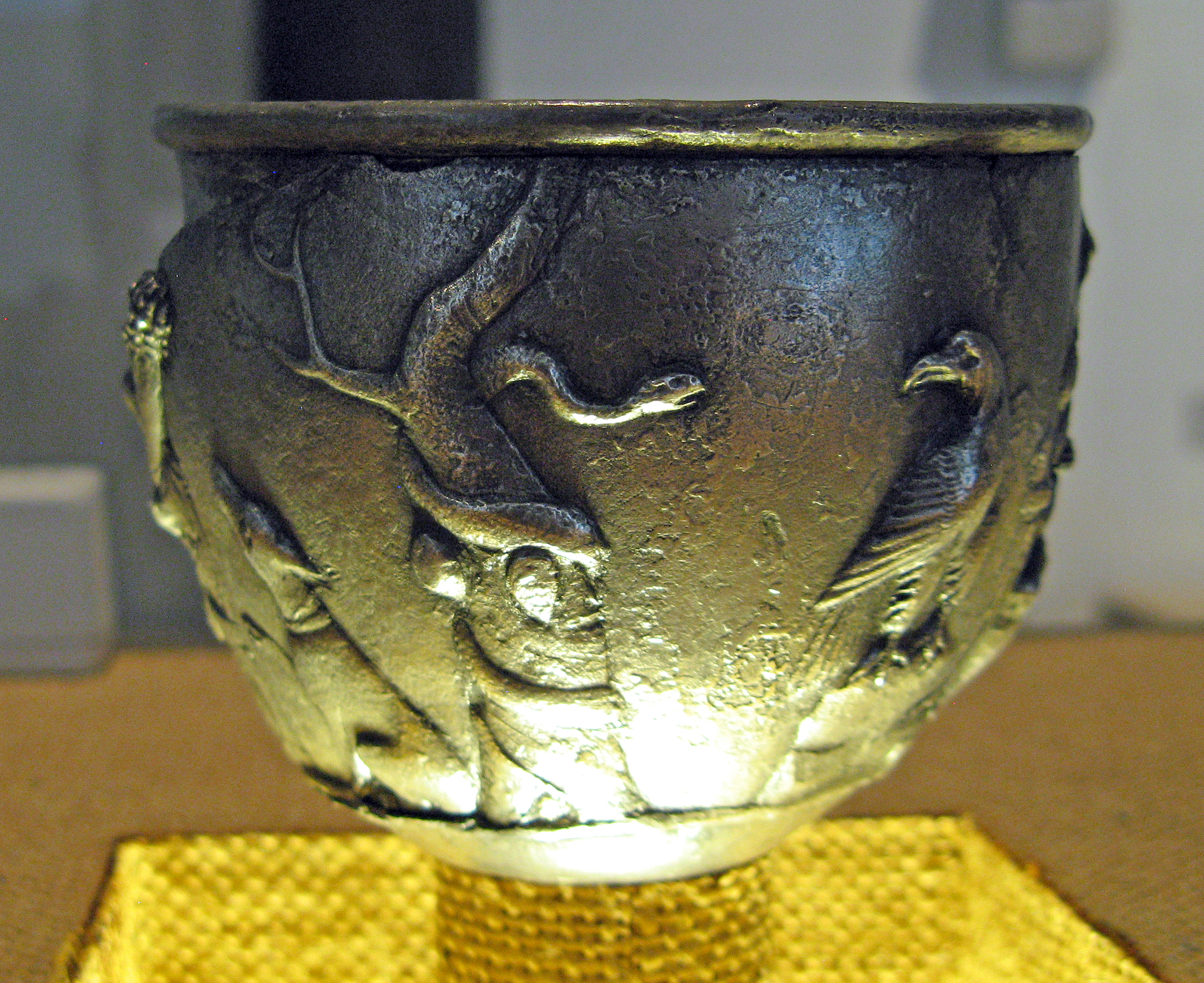
Serpent coiling around a tree and confronting the eagle, with the previous dog lower left

== Interpretation ==
The cup is acknowledged as a fine example of Gallo-Roman silverwork. The naturalism of the figures, in particular, has been highlighted. However, its interpretation is far from clear.

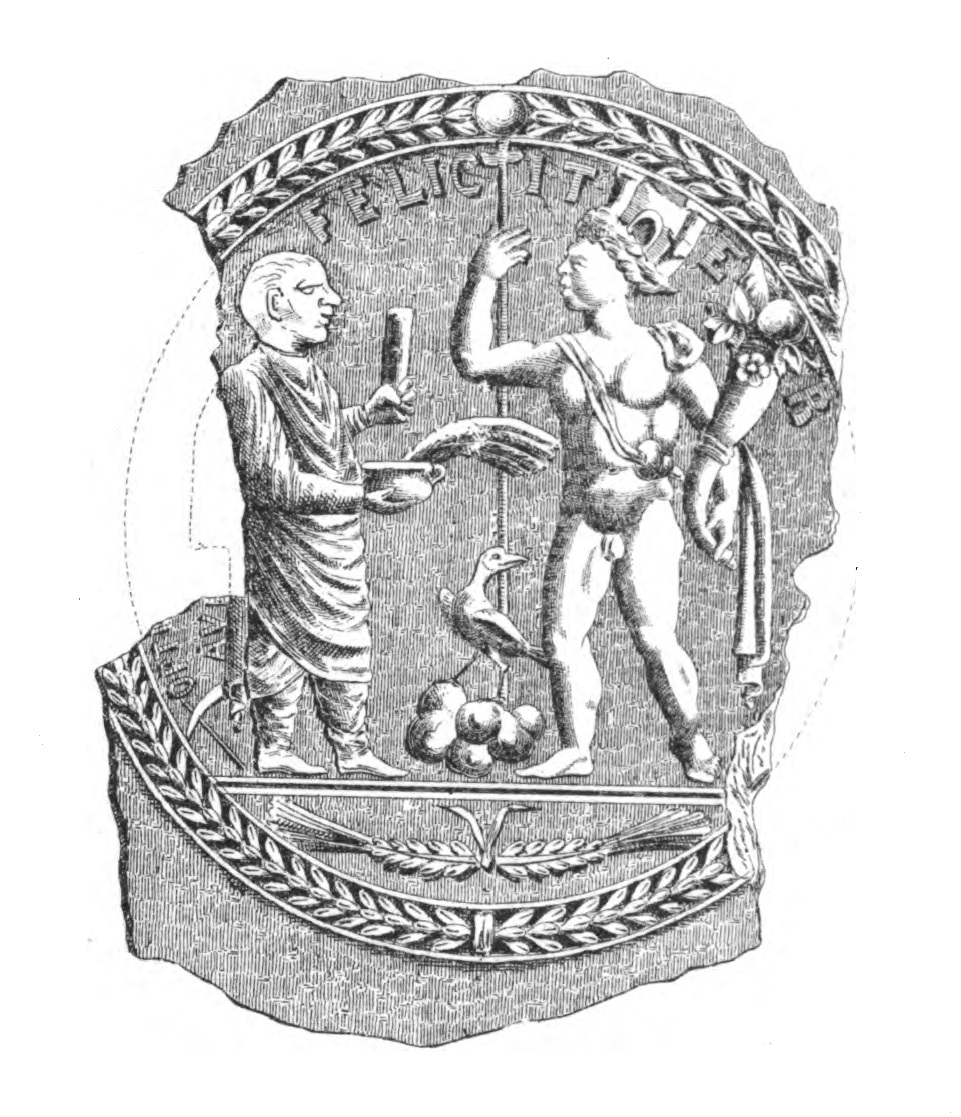
A terracotta medallion depicting Plancus, founder of Roman Lugdunum, making an offering to the genius of the city. At his feet, a raven is perched on a pile of rocks.

The cup displays a wilderness scene, with representations of various fauna and flora. There are several animals: an eagle, a serpent, a deer, a dog, a wild boar, a raven, and (perhaps) a tortoise. The raven is probably not an attribute of any god, but rather a local symbol: a popular etymology in antiquity derived the city-name "Lugdunum" from a Gaulish word for ravens, and Roman artefacts display the raven as an emblem of the city. Stéphanie Boucher points out that, while the boar is more representative of Celtic art, the presence of a snake and an eagle show broader Mediterranean influences on the cup's design. Wuilleumier points out that the two trees are diametrically opposed, dividing the cup into two registers. If the ball on the tree is of mistletoe, we know from Pliny that mistletoe had religious significance for the Gauls.

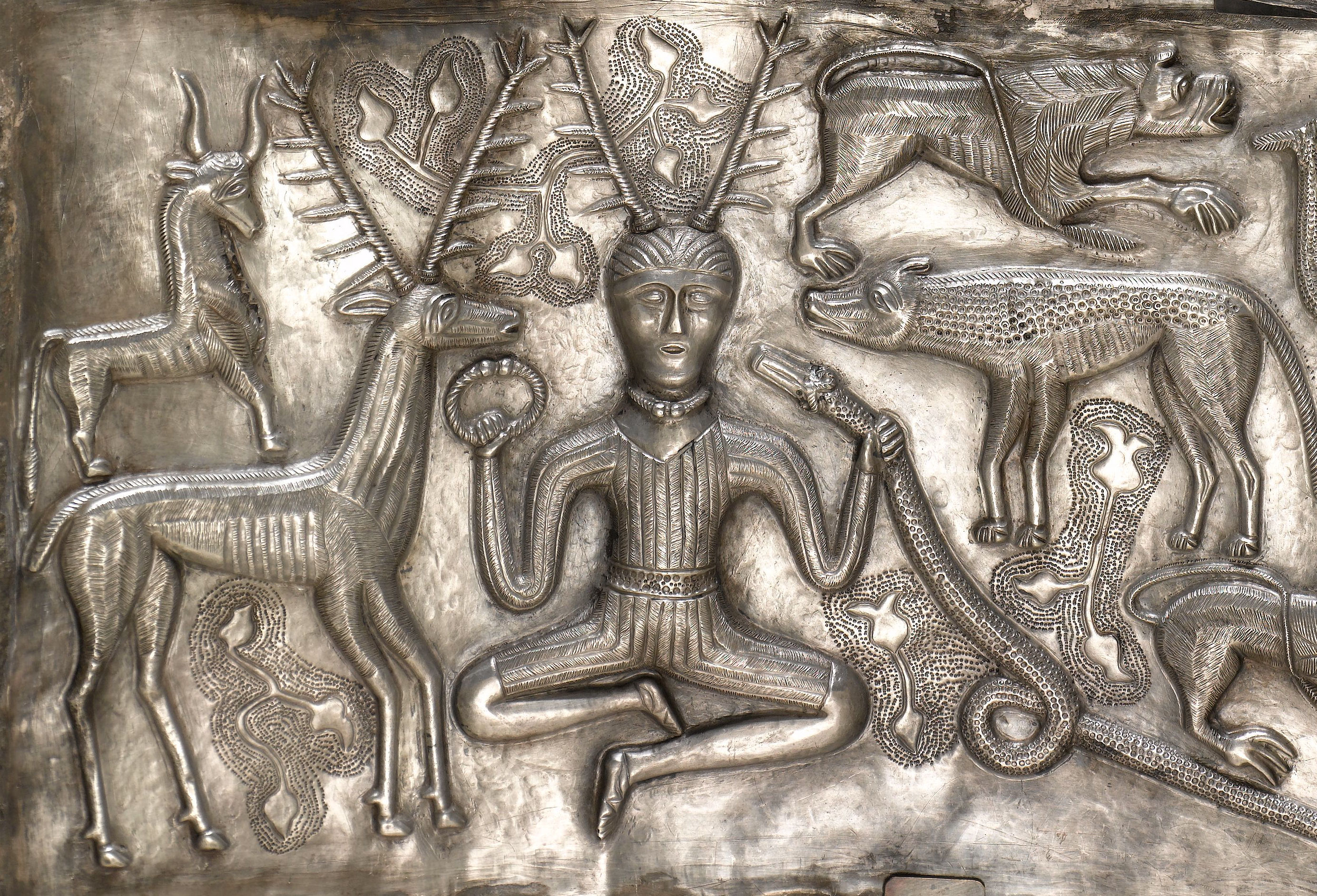
Scene with Cernunnos, a deer, a (horned) serpent, and a dog on the Gundestrup cauldron.

Wuilleumier identified the reclining figure with the Celtic stag-god Cernunnos. The proximity of the deer and the two torcs (an attribute of Cernunnos) make this identification one of the less-contested ones. Dominique Hollard and Daniel Gricourt link the snake coiled around the leafless tree with Cernunnos, as the god is associated with serpents and winter. Wuilleumier thinks the dog is a difficulty, given this interpretation, and suggests it belongs rather to the seated figure. However, Garrett Olmsted compares this arrangement of animals to a plate on the Gundestrup cauldron, where Cernunnos is surrounded by a deer, a dog, and a (horned) serpent. Phyllis Pray Bober suggests the cornucopia evidences a syncretisation of Cernunnos with the Roman god Dis Pater.

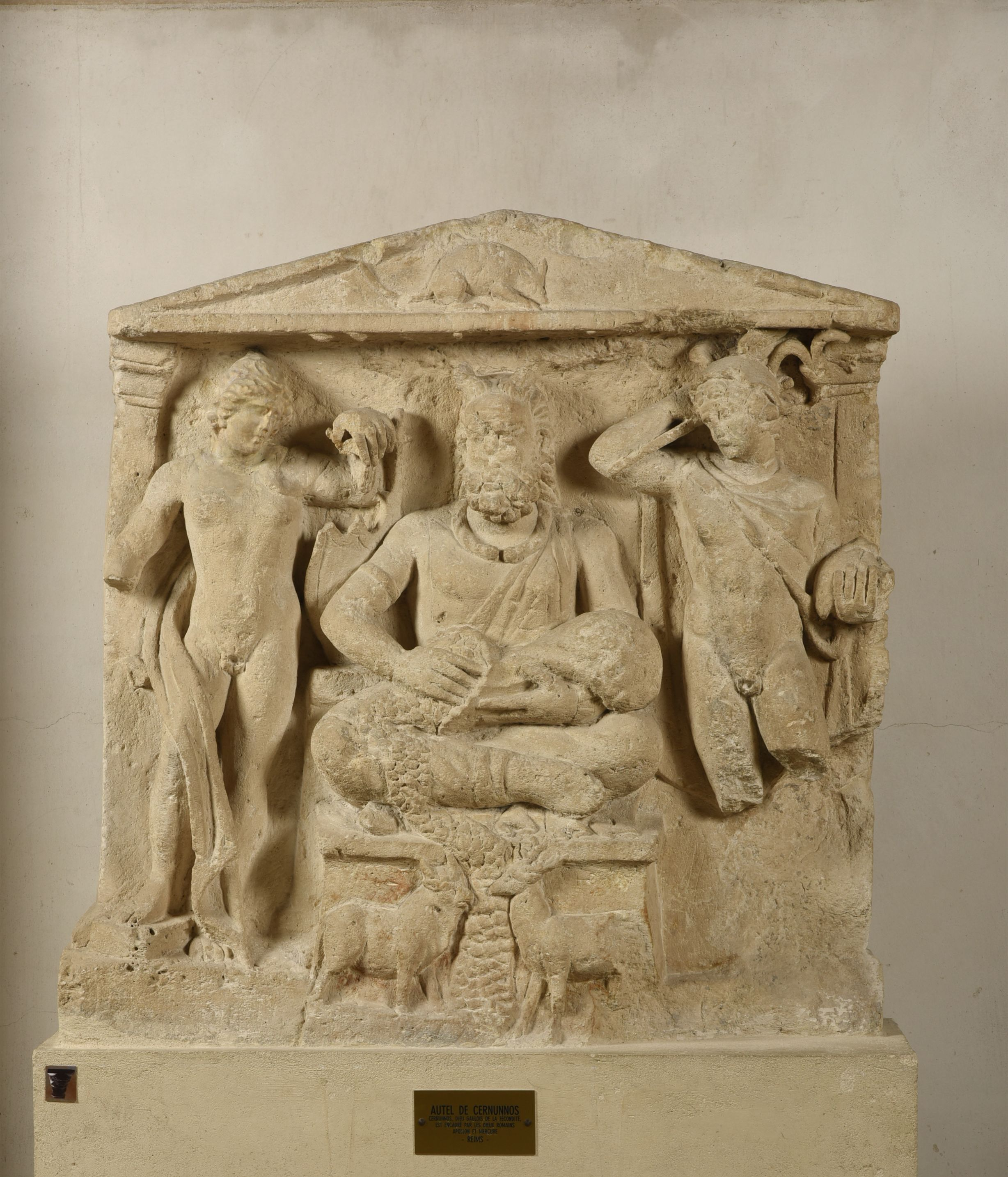
1st-century CE altar from Reims with Cernunnos, accompanied by Apollo and Mercury. Mercury has a cornucopia, while Cernunnos spills grain.

Wuilleumier identified the seated figure as Mercury. The tortoise and purse are attributes of Mercury. A relationship between Mercury and Cernunnos is otherwise evidenced in Celtic art (for example, on an altar from Reims). Mercury or his consort are often depicted with a cornucopia in Gallo-Roman art; Wuilleumier suggests that Cernunnos has the cornucopia here to emphasise the gods' closeness. This identification has received less support. Boucher points out that the figure lacks Mercury's characteristic winged helmet and caduceus.

However, following from this identification with Mercury, some have proposed a relationship between the seated figure and the Celtic god Lugus (perhaps identified with Mercury by the interpretatio romana). Hollard and Gricourt, for example, identify the figure as Lugus in the guise of Mercury. They note that if Cernunnos represents winter on the cup, then Lugus, associated with summer, would be his natural opposite.

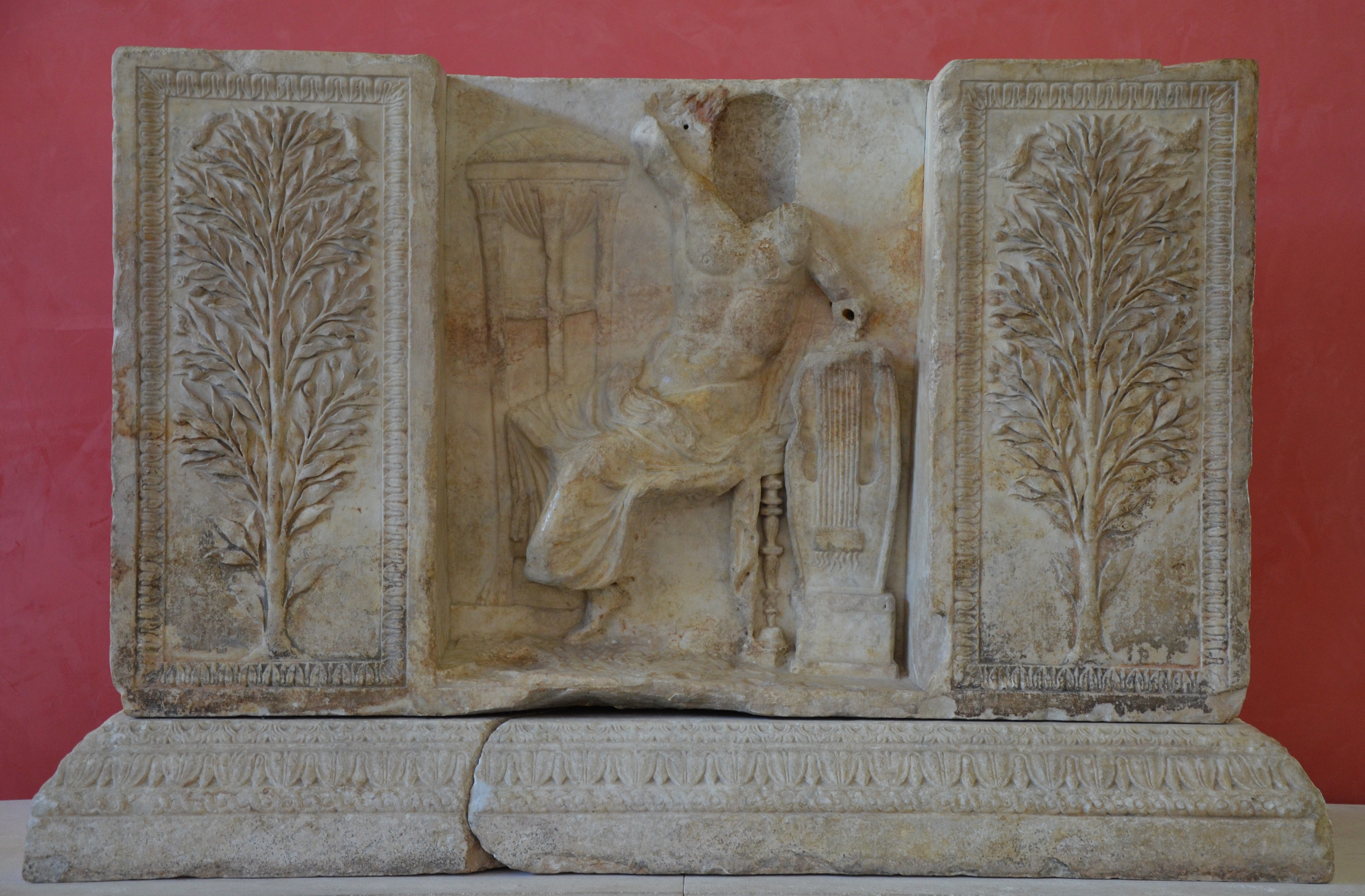
An Augustan-type Apollo with kithara, on a 1st-century BCE altar from Theatre of Arles.

Charles-Picard identifies the reclining figure with the god Apollo. He interprets an element of the design as a kithara, an instrument closely associated with Apollo, and draws comparisons to depictions of Apollo from Augustus's reign (found across Roman Gaul, for example at the Theatre of Arles). He sees, in the presence of torcs, evidence of Apollo's adaptation to Celtic sensibilities and possible syncretisation with a Gaulish god. Charles-Picard rejects the identification of the seated figure with Mercury. Seeing the circular object as a purse dropped by the raven, he tentatively identifies the figure with a human, blessed by Apollo with riches. Charles-Picard draws attention to the figure under the seated figures thighs (which Wuilleumier did not comment on); he identifies it with a table ornament, perhaps of Venus Genetrix.

Jean-Jacques Hatt has proposed a complex interpretation of the cup's design in terms of a supposed Celtic triad of gods, Taranis, Teutates, and Esus (which he takes to be syncretised, respectively, with Jupiter, Mercury, and Cernunnos). Hatt sees the seated figure as Teutates-Mercury receiving riches from the raven, a messenger of Lug-Apollo. The figure under the seated figure's thighs is Esus, emerging from the underworld and placing himself under Teutates's protection. The eagle is identified with Taranis-Jupiter and the serpent with the underworld. The reclining figure is a recovering Esus-Cernunnos. The deer next to him is the one sacrificed to return him from the underworld.

== See also ==
- Pillar of the Boatmen
- Muri statuette group
- Hoby cups
- Warren Cup
