= Germanic–Roman contacts =

Historical contact between the Romans and Germanic tribes

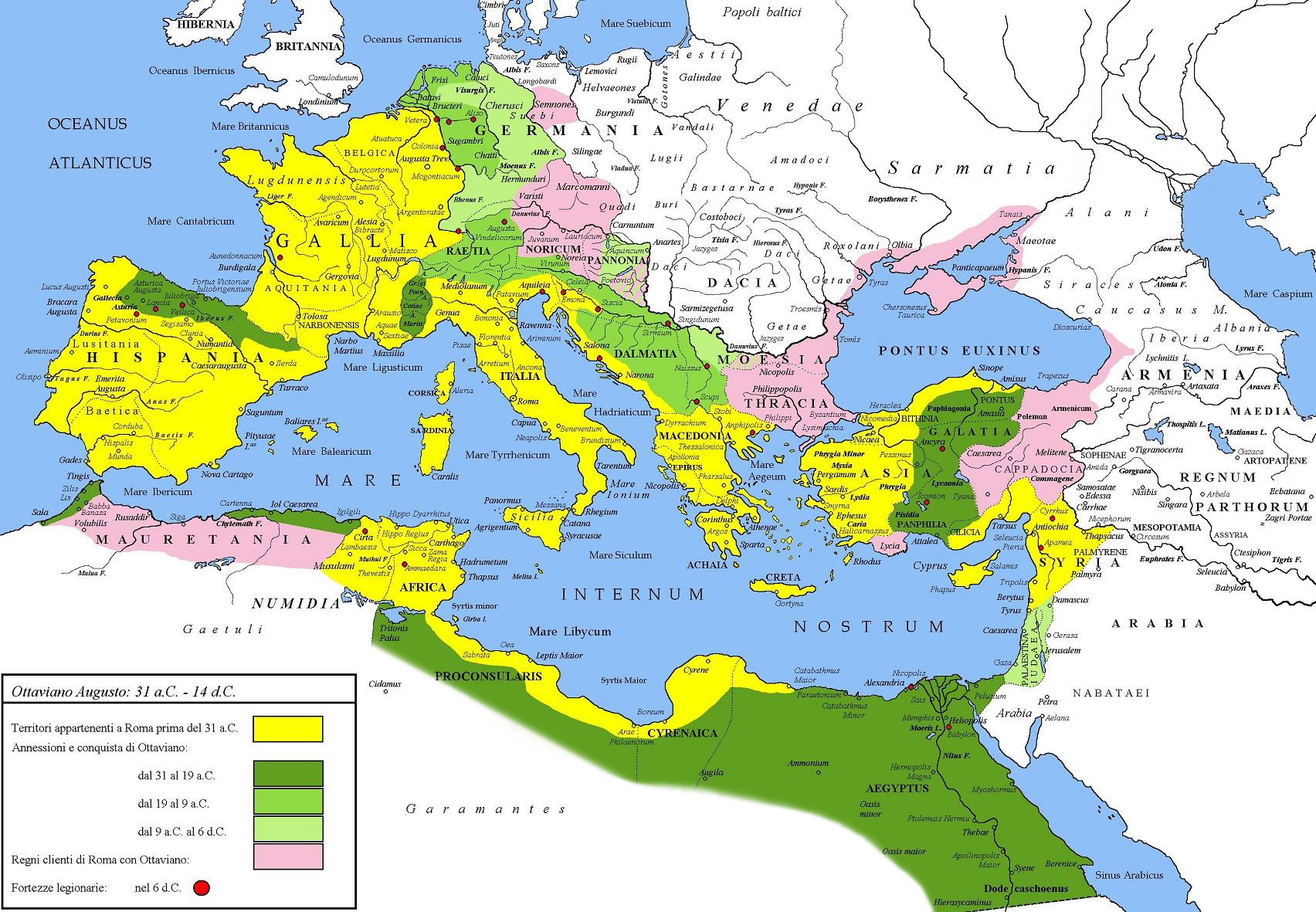
Map showing the biggest extension of Roman conquests in "Germania" during the reign of Augustus

The contact between Germanic tribes and Romans can be divided into four aspects as defined by archaeologist Are Kolberg: the military, the trade, the gift, and the plunder aspect. All these aspects give probable answers as to how and why Roman objects got into Germanic hands, and why a vast amount of Roman objects still can be found as far north as Norway. It is noteworthy to understand how Roman objects brought elements of Roman culture with them, and how they to some extent shaped Germanic culture and identity.

== History ==
The first contacts happened by the late 2nd century BC, when Roman authors recount that Gaul, Italy and Hispania were invaded by migrating Germanic tribes. This culminated in military conflict with the armies of the Roman Republic, in particular those of the Roman Consul Gaius Marius. Six decades later, Julius Caesar invoked the threat of such attacks as one justification for his annexation of Gaul to Rome.

As Rome expanded to the Rhine and Danube rivers, it incorporated many societies into the Empire. The tribal homelands to the north and east emerged collectively in the records as Germania. The peoples of this area were sometimes at war with Rome, but also engaged in complex and long-term trade relations, military alliances, and cultural exchanges with Rome as well.

The Cimbri and Teutoni incursions into Roman Italy were thrust back in 101 BC. These invasions were written up by Caesar and others as presaging of a Northern danger for the Roman Republic, a danger that should be controlled. In the Augustean period there was—as a result of Roman activity as far as the Elbe River—a first definition of the "Germania magna": from Rhine and Danube in the West and South to the Vistula and the Baltic Sea in the East and North.

Caesar's wars helped establish the term Germania. The initial purpose of the Roman campaigns was to protect Transalpine Gaul by controlling the area between the Rhine and the Elbe. In AD 9, a revolt of their Germanic subjects headed by the supposed Roman ally, Arminius, (along with his decisive defeat of Publius Quinctilius Varus and the destruction of three Roman legions in the surprise attack on the Romans at the Battle of the Teutoburg Forest) ended in the withdrawal of the Roman frontier to the Rhine. At the end of the 1st century two provinces west of the Rhine called Germania Inferior and Germania Superior were established. Important medieval cities such as Aachen, Cologne, Trier, Mainz, Worms and Speyer were part of these Roman provinces.

North of the Limes Germanicus, there were only trade contacts between Romans and Scandinavia, mainly with Jutes of Denmark. Indeed, the Roman Empire maintained trade-routes and relations with Danish or proto-Danish peoples, as attested by finds of Roman coins. Depletion of cultivated land in the last century BC seems to have contributed to increasing migrations in northern Europe and increasing conflict between Teutonic tribes and Roman settlements in Gaul: Roman artefacts are especially common in finds from the 1st century in Jutland. It seems clear that some part of the Danish warrior-aristocracy served in the Roman army.

== Military aspect ==
Members of different Germanic tribes and communities served in the Roman legions. It's probable that Germanic chieftains who fought with the Romans tried to adapt to and adopt Roman culture, and that they sought to identify with the Roman nobility. In exchange for military service, they received Roman objects, although not Roman weapons as Roman laws prohibited the exporting of arms to Germanic tribes. Germanic tribes who fought against the Romans seized weapons and armor as war spoils.

The Romans probably influenced Germanic military tactics and organisation as well. This can be discerned from the huge Illerup Ådal excavation in Denmark, in which huge amounts of Roman and Roman inspired arms and equipment were found. Many of these were probably produced in Scandinavia; many had Scandinavian "factory seals" after a Roman model. This not only tells us that the Germans did indeed use Roman arms, but it also tells us that they had the required knowledge and social organisation to support large armies, as well as produce standardised arms and equipment.

It has been suggested that the Romans supported and equipped Germanic tribes in the part of Germania, which is today's Denmark. Archaeological sources tell of Roman equipment and arms that have been discovered as far north as Scandinavia. Danish archaeologists Lars Jørgensen, Birger Storgaard and Ulla Lund Hansen have suggested Germano-Roman alliances, in which Romans supported a Germanic power in today's Denmark. According to Jørgensen, this was either to destabilize Scandinavia, or to create a Roman friendly power which could help ensure peace and stability in the border areas.

Ulla Lund Hansen and Birger Storgaard have also suggested that Roman interests in Scandinavia were strong, and that there was direct contact. Storgaard alluded to a text written in accordance with an expedition led by Tiberius in year 5 A.D., in which Tiberius describes what has been interpreted to be Jutland, in Denmark, although this interpretation is based on myth. Jørgensen points to the Gudme-Lundeborg complex in Denmark. Archaeologists have found Roman coins and scrap metal at Lundeborg, a trading place in relation to this complex.

== Trade aspect ==
The Roman Empire depended on trade in many different ways, such as the import of grain. This was especially the case in the early periods of the Roman Empire. Lynn F. Pitts wrote:

…At all periods Rome needed to have some kind of relationship, friendly or otherwise, with her neighbours….

It's thus very likely that a lot of the Roman objects found in Scandinavia arrived via trade and trade networks. Grain was a significant commodity in the Roman society.

This trade may have been carried out via already existing trade networks, from the Mediterranean, via Germanic chieftains to Scandinavia. These trade networks may have been established prior to the Roman Empire and suggest a complex and advanced social structure and organisation among the Germanic tribes and societies. Scandinavian amber has been found at Mycene, in Greece.

== Gift aspect ==
Another aspect of Germanic–Romanic inter-relations is the exchange of gifts. Artefacts may have been traded to the Germanic peoples as diplomatic gifts in order to enhance and strengthen alliances, bonds and the likes. Archaeologist Lynn F. Pitts writes about the Roman relationship to the Marcomanni and the Quadi that:

Rome was perhaps concerned to cultivate these Germanic tribes in order to counterbalance […] their neighbours. Diplomacy rather than military strength kept the peace along […] the frontier.

The Roman Empire became increasingly vulnerable as they expanded, thus stretching their military capacity. Pitts go on to write that the Marcomans were a very strong military power, with a standing army of 7000 infantry and 4000 cavalry. It's obvious that the Romans wanted to maintain peaceful relations with certain Germanic tribes, especially towards the end of the Roman Empire, when it became ever increasingly weak. Pitts points out that ”…it is apparent [sic?] that, apart from short periods of hostilities, relations between Rome and the Marcomanni and Quadi were friendly…”.

It became more and more common, as the Roman Empire neared its end, that the Romans paid tribute to Germanic armies who threatened to invade Rome.

== Plunder aspect ==
As the Western Roman Empire collapsed, Germanic tribes reclaimed land taken by the Roman Empire. Thus many Roman objects were obtained, proliferating throughout much of Germania, most likely via the already existing trade networks, all the way to Scandinavia. War spoils may have also added to proliferation of Roman artefacts. This may also explain the high number of Roman arms in Germanic hands, despite the Roman arms embargo. Two silver cups found in a grave in Hoby, in Denmark, are likely to have been war spoils from the Battle of the Teutoburg Forest in 9 A.D.

== End of the Roman empire ==
A popular belief is that Germanic barbarians suddenly invaded and destroyed Roman civilization. Others argue the opposite is true. Hilaire Belloc observes, “What we are told is that the Western Empire was overrun by savage tribes, but there was no barbarian conquest. There was a continuation of what had been going on for centuries, an infiltration of people from outside the Empire because within the Empire they could get the advantages of civilization.”

Norman Cantor points out, “The great invasions were not a war of the barbarians to defeat and subjugate the Roman Empire. Rather, the Germans sought to become part of the Empire and were fighting for concessions, in the form of land or money. They came as settlers and as allies. They did not defeat the Roman Empire in one cataclysmic battle; instead, they permeated the Roman world over the course of three centuries and transformed the fundamental nature of Roman civilization.”

== See also ==
- History of Germany
- Netherlands in the Roman era
