= Dyfri Williams =

British classical archaeologist (born 1952)

Dyfri Williams (born 8 February 1952) is a British classical archaeologist. Williams received his doctorate in 1978 from Oxford University, writing on the work of the Antiphon Painter. He joined the Department of Antiquities at the British Museum in 1979. From 1993 to 2007, he was the museum's Keeper of Greek and Roman Antiquities. Since December 2007 he has been the research Keeper.

Williams' main research areas are the collections of Attic vase painting, and ancient Greek metalwork as well as questions of history. He has been a corresponding member of the German Archaeological Institute and Fellow of the Society of Antiquaries of London.

== Bibliography ==
- Williams, Dyfri (1985), Greek vases, Harvard University Press, ISBN 9780674363151
- Williams, Dyfri (1993). Corpus vasorum antiquorum. London: Trustees of the British Museum. ISBN 0-7141-2201-7.
- Williams, Dyfri; Ogden, Jack; Museum, British; Metropolitan Museum of Art (New York, N.Y.) (1994), Greek gold : jewellery of the classical world, Abrams, ISBN 9780870997136
- Podany, Jerry; Williams, Dyfri (2000), The Parthenon sculptures : cleaning and controversy, British Museum, ISBN 9780714122298
- Williams, Dyfri (2006), The Warren cup, British Museum objects in focus., British Museum Press, ISBN 9780714122601
- Williams, Dyfri; Museum, British; Press, University of Texas (2009), Masterpieces of classical art, University of Texas Press, ISBN 978-0292721470
- Williams, Dyfri (2009). Masterpieces of Classical Art. London: British Museum Publications. ISBN 978-0714122540.
- Fitton, J Lesley; Meeks, Nigel; Williams, Dyfri; Museum, British (2009), The Aigina treasure : Aegean Bronze Age jewellery and a mystery revisited, British Museum Press, ISBN 978-0714122625
- Williams, Dyfri; Morton, Kate (2013), The East pediment of the Parthenon : from Perikles to Nero, Bulletin supplement - University of London. Institute of Classical Studies, 118., Institute of classical studies, School of advanced study, University of London, cop. 2013, ISBN 978-1905670437
