= Hoby treasure =

Iron Age grave goods found in Denmark

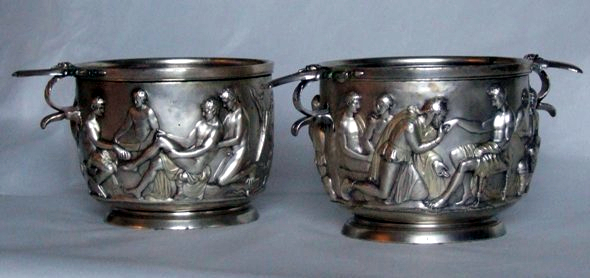
- Copies of the Hoby silver cups
- Material: Silver, bronze, gold, iron
- Created: c. 1-150 AD
- Discovered: 1920
- Present location: National Museum of Denmark, Copenhagen

The Hoby treasure is the grave goods from a Roman Iron Age grave at Hoby on the island of Lolland in Denmark. It was discovered in 1920 during the digging of a drain and excavated by archaeologists from the National Museum of Denmark. The most famous part of the treasure is two Roman drinking cups with scenes from the Iliad.

== Discovery and description ==
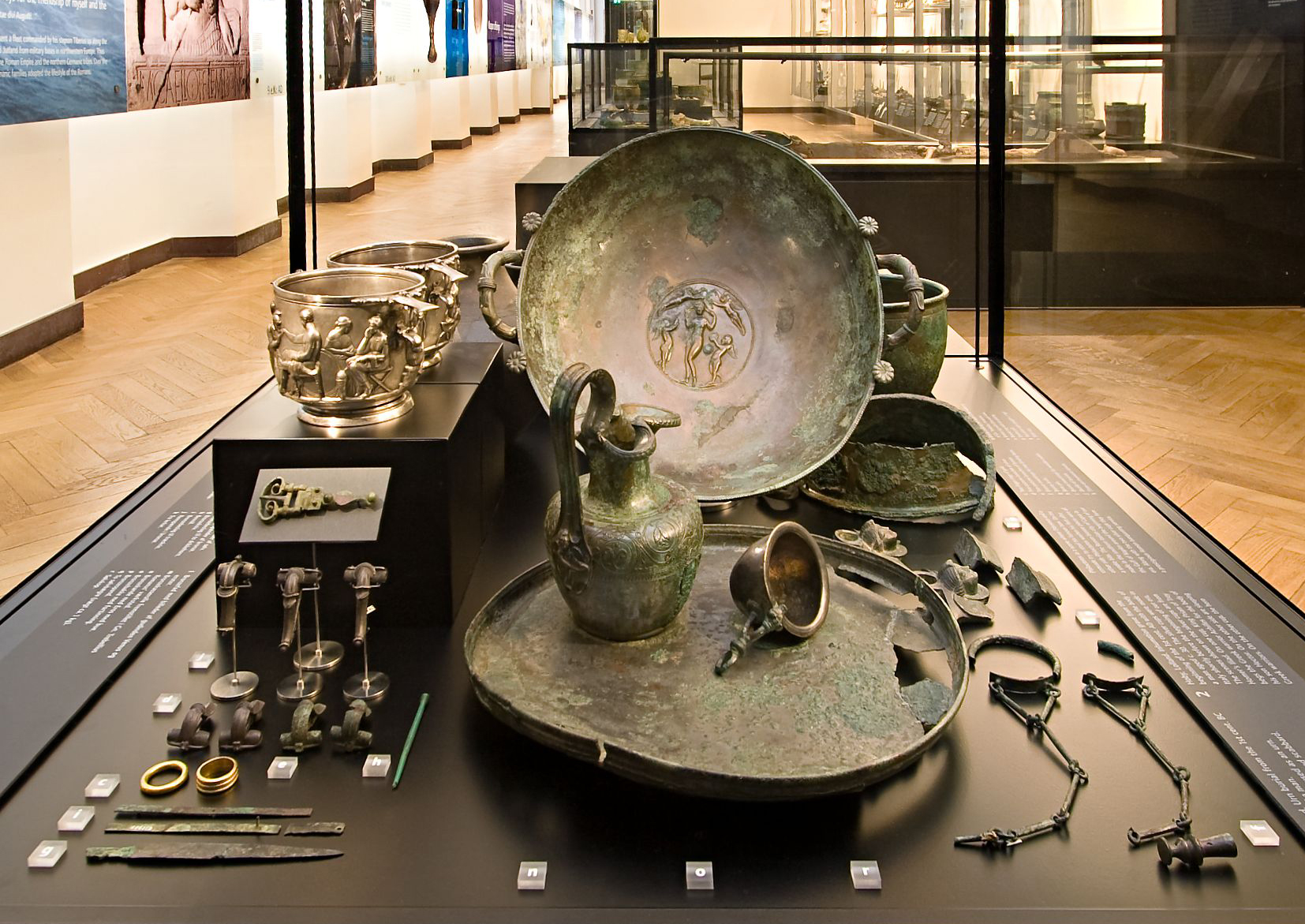
Burial goods from the Hoby chieftain's grave on display at the National Museum of Denmark

The grave was discovered in 1920 at Hoby on the Danish island of Lolland. It is assumed to be the grave of a chieftain and contained the remains of a middle-aged man approximately 187 cm in height and buried in the first century AD. He was found in a wooden coffin buried about two meters below the surface. Analysis of several teeth found with the remains indicates that the man was native to the area, and aged around 25–35 at death. Along with the body was a rich amount of both indigenous and imported Roman goods. The objects were handed over to the National Museum of Denmark.

The most famous goods are a Roman table service, made in Italy around the beginning of the Common Era. It consists of a washing dish, a wine bucket with a scoop, a jug, tray and two drinking cups. The drinking cups stand out as the most famous part of the set. They weigh around one kilogram each, are made of silver and show scenes from the Iliad by Homer. They are signed by the craftsman Cheirisophos and have engravings with the name Silius, who is assumed to be the original Roman owner of the objects. The other objects discovered in the grave are another silver cup with bronze handle, the bronze mountings from a missing drinking horn, a bronze knife, a bone pin, a casket made of wood, sheets of bronze and iron, a belt buckle, two gold rings, seven fibulae, three pottery vessels, and two hams.

== Significance ==
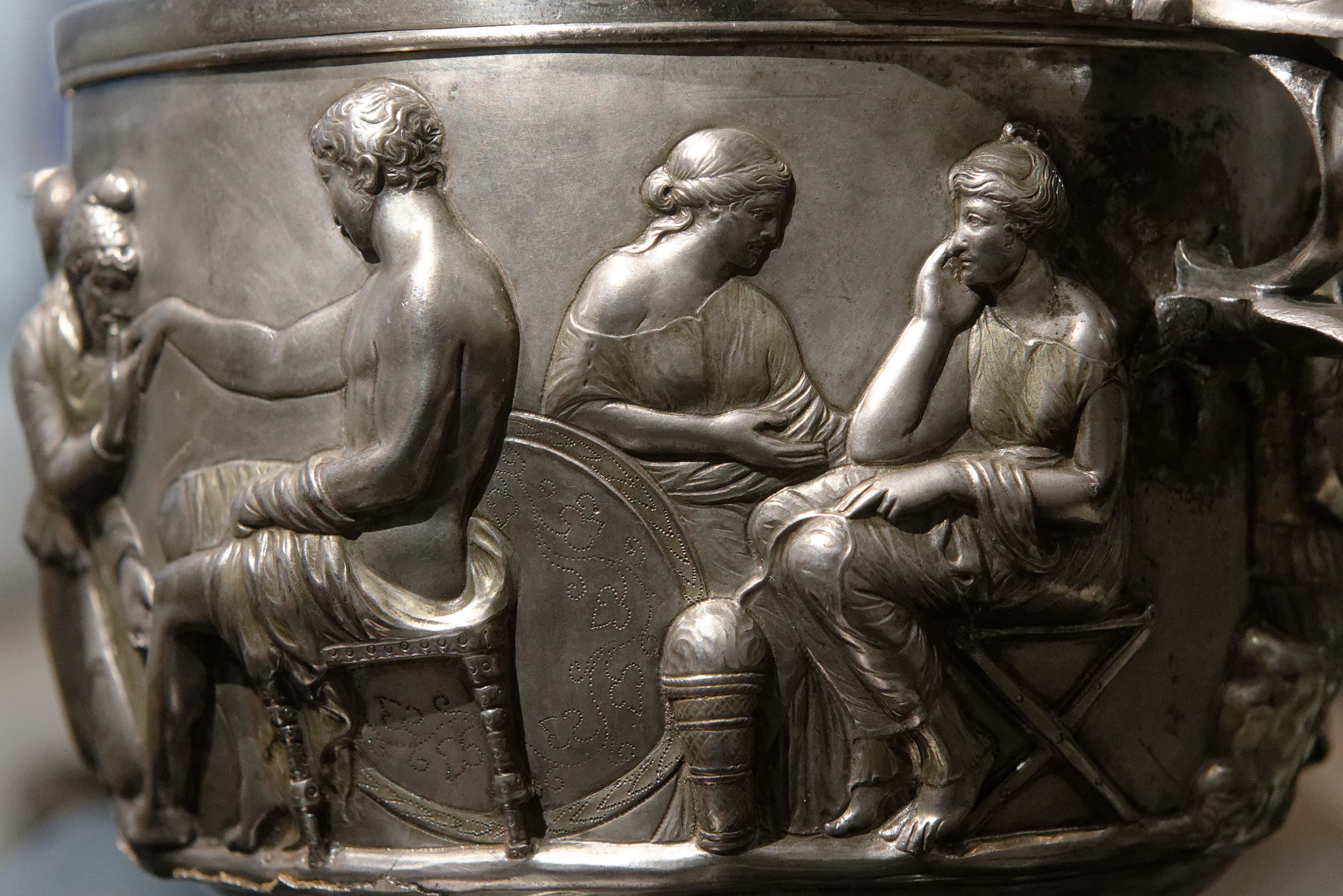
Detail of the repoussé relief

The find is regarded as an example of an early Germanic prestige burial. It is significant for its attestation of interaction between Germanic and Roman culture. The tableware has been interpreted as part of an attempt by a local elite to manifest high status by imitating Roman drinking customs. The archeologist Knud Friis Johansen has written that their presence at the site might have resulted from a conscious Roman attempt to influence Germanic elites. The Silius whose name is on the cups might have been the commandant Gaius Silius, who was posted to Mainz in 14–21 AD. The cups could have been a direct or indirect gift from Gaius Silius to the man buried in the grave, although this cannot be proved.

The site was excavated again in 2012. This was done as part of a project aimed at studying the pre-Christian religion. In addition to Hoby, the project involved excavations at Toftegård and Tissø on Zealand, and Gudme on Funen. In 2016, areas to the south and east were investigated on suspicion of other graves being present, but none were found at that time.

== See also ==
- Kleinaspergle
- Hildesheim Treasure
- Lyon cup
